= Von Hippel =

Von Hippel is a German surname and may refer to:

- Arthur von Hippel (physician) (1841–1916), a German ophthalmologist
  - Robert von Hippel (1866–1951), a German criminal lawyer, his son
    - Arthur R. von Hippel (1898–2003), a German-American physicist, grandson of Arthur von Hippel and nephew of Eugen von Hippel
      - Eric von Hippel (born 1941), an American economist, son of Arthur R. von Hippel
      - Frank N. von Hippel, an American nuclear physicist, son of Arthur R. von Hippel
  - Eugen von Hippel (1867–1939), a German ophthalmologist, his son (discoverer of Von Hippel–Lindau disease)
- Karin von Hippel
- Theodor Gottlieb von Hippel the Elder (1741–1796), a German satirist
  - Theodor Gottlieb von Hippel the Younger (1775–1843), a Prussian statesman, his nephew
- Theodor von Hippel, a German army and intelligence officer during World War II
