= ELOA =

Protein-coding gene in humans

Identifiers
- Aliases: ELOA, EloA, SIII, SIII p110, TCEB3A, TCEB3, transcription elongation factor B subunit 3, elongin A
- External IDs: OMIM: 600786; MGI: 1351315; GeneCards: ELOA
Available structures
PDB	Ortholog search: PDBe RCSB
PDB	List of PDB id codes 4HFX

Gene location (Human)
Chr.	Chromosome 1 (human)
Band	1p36.11	Start	23,743,448 bp
Band	1p36.11	End	23,762,059 bp

Gene location (Mouse)
Chr.	Chromosome 4 (mouse)
Band	4|4 D3	Start	135,730,679 bp
Band	4|4 D3	End	135,749,074 bp
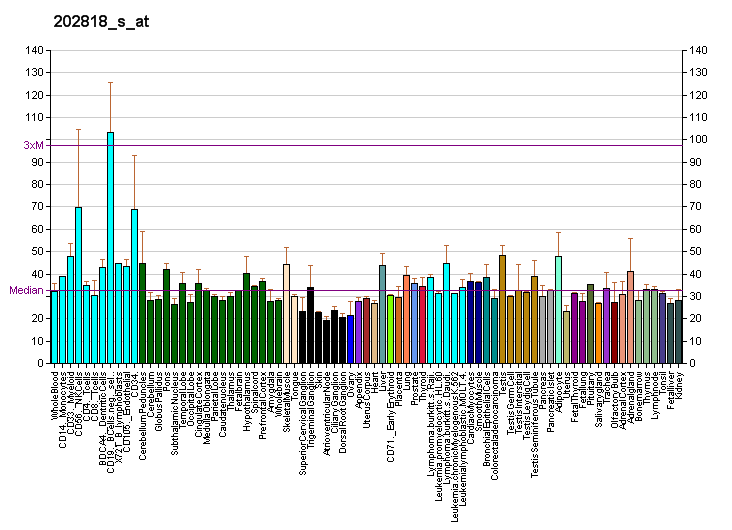

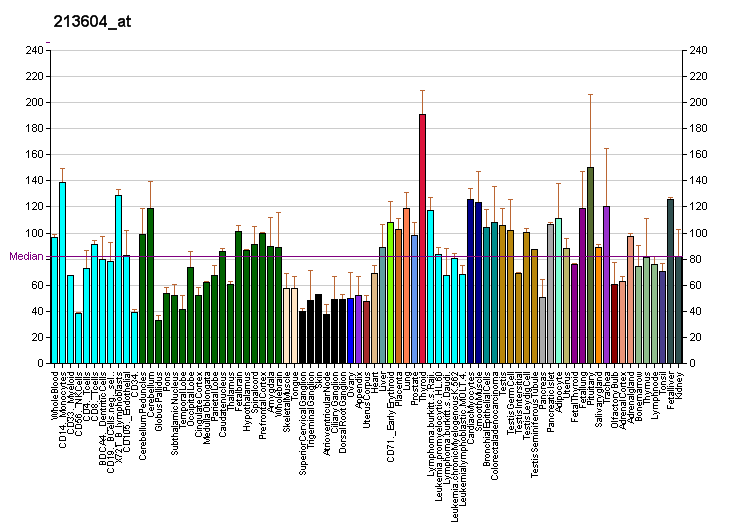

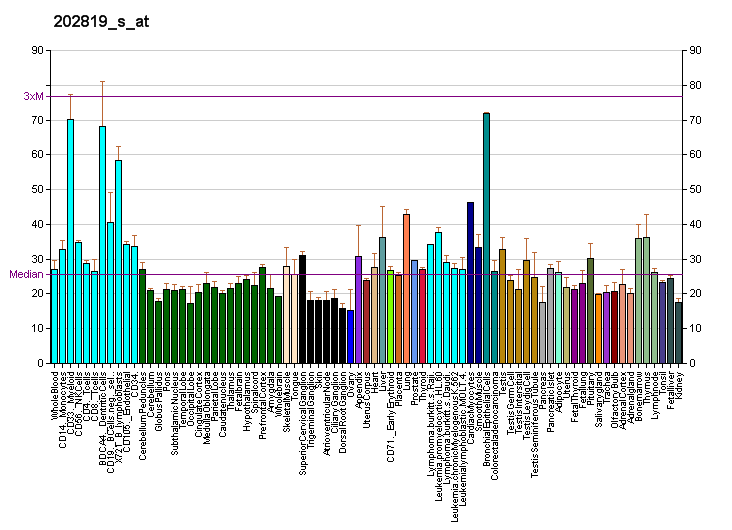
RNA expression pattern
Bgee	Human / Mouse (ortholog); Top expressed in: buccal mucosa cell; lower lobe of lung; cardia; glutes; Skeletal muscle tissue of biceps brachii; myocardium of left ventricle; skin of arm; Skeletal muscle tissue of rectus abdominis; gingival epithelium; thoracic diaphragm / Top expressed in: molar; granulocyte; plantaris muscle; extensor digitorum longus muscle; triceps brachii muscle; ankle; medial head of gastrocnemius muscle; temporal muscle; quadriceps femoris muscle; muscle of thigh; More reference expression data
BioGPS	More reference expression data
Gene ontology
Molecular function	protein binding
Cellular component	nucleus; nucleoplasm; extracellular space; elongin complex
Biological process	transcription elongation from RNA polymerase II promoter; regulation of transcription, DNA-templated; transcription by RNA polymerase II; transcription, DNA-templated; regulation of transcription by RNA polymerase II
Sources:Amigo / QuickGO
Orthologs
Databases	NCBI: entry; OMA: entry
Species	Human	Mouse
Entrez	6924	27224
Ensembl	ENSG00000011007	ENSMUSG00000028668
UniProt	Q14241	Q8CB77
RefSeq (mRNA)	NM_003198	NM_013736
RefSeq (protein)	NP_003189	NP_038764
Location (UCSC)	Chr 1: 23.74 – 23.76 Mb	Chr 4: 135.73 – 135.75 Mb
PubMed search
- Wikidata
View/Edit Human	View/Edit Mouse

Elongin A is a protein that in humans is encoded by the ELOA gene.

Elongin A is a subunit of the transcription factor B (SIII) complex. The SIII complex is composed of elongins A/A2, B and C. It activates elongation by RNA polymerase II by suppressing transient pausing of the polymerase at many sites within transcription units. Elongin A functions as the transcriptionally active component of the SIII complex, whereas elongins B and C are regulatory subunits. Elongin A2 is specifically expressed in the testis and is capable of forming a stable complex with elongins B and C. The von Hippel–Lindau tumor suppressor protein binds to elongins B and C and thereby inhibits transcription elongation.
