= Arthur von Hippel =

Arthur von Hippel may refer to:

- Arthur R. von Hippel (1898–2003), German American materials scientist and physicist
- Arthur von Hippel (physician) (1841–1916), German ophthalmologist
