= Prefoldin subunit 3 =

Chaperone protein

VBP1

Identifiers
- Aliases: VBP1, PFD3, PFDN3, VBP-1, HIBBJ46, von Hippel-Lindau binding protein 1, VHL binding protein 1
- External IDs: OMIM: 300133; MGI: 1333804; GeneCards: VBP1

Gene location (Human)
Chr.	X chromosome (human)
Band	Xq28	Start	155,197,007 bp
Band	Xq28	End	155,239,841 bp

Gene location (Mouse)
Chr.	X chromosome (mouse)
Band	X A7.3|X 38.25 cM	Start	74,557,905 bp
Band	X A7.3|X 38.25 cM	End	74,578,548 bp
RNA expression pattern
Bgee	Human / Mouse (ortholog); Top expressed in: biceps brachii; Skeletal muscle tissue of rectus abdominis; thoracic diaphragm; vastus lateralis muscle; ganglionic eminence; Skeletal muscle tissue of biceps brachii; myocardium of left ventricle; ventricular zone; deltoid muscle; right ventricle / Top expressed in: superior cervical ganglion; medial ganglionic eminence; atrioventricular valve; trigeminal ganglion; arcuate nucleus; habenula; median eminence; paraventricular nucleus of hypothalamus; dorsomedial hypothalamic nucleus; primitive streak; More reference expression data
BioGPS	n/a
Gene ontology
Molecular function	tubulin binding; protein binding
Cellular component	polysome; intracellular membrane-bounded organelle; nucleus; prefoldin complex; cytoplasm; cytosol
Biological process	tubulin complex assembly; microtubule-based process; protein folding
Sources:Amigo / QuickGO
Orthologs
Databases	NCBI: entry; OMA: entry
Species	Human	Mouse
Entrez	7411	22327
Ensembl	ENSG00000155959	ENSMUSG00000031197
UniProt	P61758	P61759
RefSeq (mRNA)	NM_003372; NM_001303543; NM_001303544; NM_001303545	NM_011692
RefSeq (protein)	NP_001290472; NP_001290473; NP_001290474; NP_003363	NP_035822
Location (UCSC)	Chr X: 155.2 – 155.24 Mb	Chr X: 74.56 – 74.58 Mb
PubMed search
- Wikidata
View/Edit Human	View/Edit Mouse

Prefoldin subunit 3 (VBP-1), also called Von Hippel–Lindau binding protein 1, is a protein that in humans is encoded by the VBP1 gene. It is a prefoldin chaperone protein that binds to von Hippel–Lindau protein and transports it from perinuclear granules to the nucleus or cytoplasm inside the cell. It is also involved in transporting nascent polypeptides to cytosolic chaperonins for post-translational folding.

VBP-1 is a 197–amino acid heterohexamer comprising two prefoldin-α and four prefoldin-β subunits, and is a member of the prefoldin-α subunit family. It is ubiquitously expressed in tissues, and is located in the cell nucleus and cytoplasm. Homologues are known to exist between human VBP-1 and proteins in mice, Drosophila and C. elegans.

== See also ==
- Von Hippel–Lindau tumor suppressor
- Von Hippel–Lindau disease
- Eugen von Hippel
- Arvid Lindau
