= Viral infectivity factor =

Protein found in lentiviruses

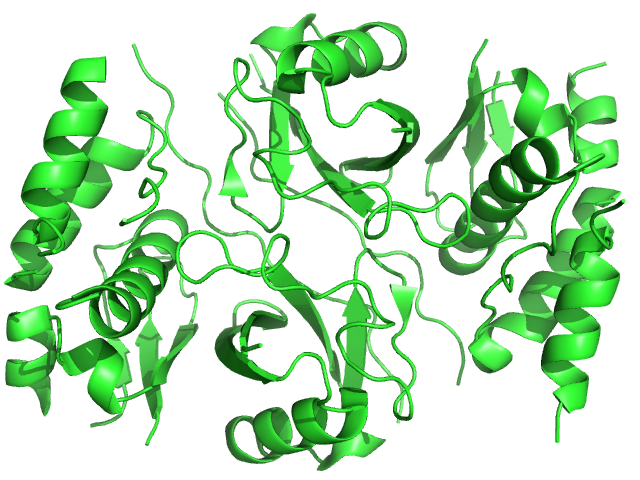
- HIV-1 Vif BC-box in Complex with Human ELOB and ELOC (PDB: 3DCG).

Identifiers
- Symbol: Vif
- Pfam: PF00559
- InterPro: IPR000475
Available protein structures:
- PDB: IPR000475 PF00559 (ECOD; PDBsum)
- AlphaFold: IPR000475; PF00559

Viral infectivity factor, or Vif, is an accessory protein found in HIV and other lentiviruses. Its role is to disrupt the antiviral activity of the human enzyme APOBEC (specifically APOBEC3G, "A3G" in short, and other A3 enzymes) by targeting it for ubiquitination and cellular degradation. APOBEC is a cytidine deaminase enzyme that mutates viral nucleic acids.

Despite the functional and (weak) structural similarities, Vif found in lentiviruses can function in quite different ways. For example, the HIV-1 Vif ("Vif_{1}" hereafter) and HIV-2 Vif ("Vif_{2}") attach to APOBEC from different ends of themselves and have a different spectrum of inhibition. As HIV-1 is older and more virulent, many more studies have been done on the Vif_{1} than on the Vif_{2}. Similarly, more studies have been done on the HIV/SIV Vif than on any other lentiviral Vif.

== Mechanism ==
=== HIV-1 ===
Vif_{1} is a 23-kilodalton protein that is essential for viral replication. Vif_{1} inhibits the cellular protein APOBEC3G from entering the virion during budding from a host cell by targeting it for proteasomal degradation. Vif_{1} binds to A3G as well as the cellular Cullin5 E3 Ubiquitin Ligase (ELOB-ELOC-CUL5) and a CBFB cofactor so that the ligase can be hijacked to tag A3G for degradation. The crystal Structure of the HIV-1 Vif BC-box in Complex with Human Elongin B and Elongin C was solved in 2008, and the structure of the full Vif_{1}/E3 complex was solved in 2014.

In the absence of Vif, APOBEC3G causes hypermutation of the viral genome, rendering it dead-on-arrival at the next host cell. APOBEC3G is thus a host defence to retroviral infection which HIV-1 has overcome by the acquisition of Vif. Vif_{1} is additionally able to inhibit human A3C, A3D, A3F, and A3H haplotype II, all of which can similarly be packaged and cause hypermutation in Vif-deficient HIV-1. Different surfaces on Vif_{1} are used to bind A3C, A3F, and A3G.

Vif may still be able to inhibit A3 in ways independent of degradation. Vif_{1} seems to reduce the amount of A3 proteins (including A3D/G/F) packaged in the virion, and to slow down the action of any A3G that does make it in.

Vif_{1} was considered as a phosphoprotein and phosphorylation seemed to be required for viral infectivity. But recent studies with the use of metabolic labelling demonstrated that serine/threonine phosphorylation of Vif_{1} and A3G is not required for the interaction of Vif_{1} with A3G for Vif dependent degradation of A3G and the antiviral activity of A3G. However, a recent study by Raja et al. has shown that Host AKT-Mediated phosphorylation of HIV-1 Vif at Thr20 stabilizes it to enhance APOBEC3G degradation and potentiate HIV-1 infectivity.

=== HIV-2 ===
Vif_{2} is only about ~30% identical at the amino acid level to Vif_{1}, a result of the evolutionary separation in different source species of the two viruses (see Subtypes of HIV). In 2014, it was discovered that Vif_{2} attaches to A3G and A3F using very different residues compared to Vif_{1}, and that it, unlike Vif_{1}, cannot inhibit A3D at all. In 2016, it was found that Vif_{2} also attaches to A3C differently. In 2021, it was found that Vif_{2} inhibits A3B (which HIV-1 does not) and that A3B is able to inhibit a Vif-less HIV-2 (but not a Vif-less HIV-1). As A3B is also implicated in hypermutation in cancer, this discovery could lead to a way to slow down cancer cells.

No structure of Vif_{2} can be found in the Protein Data Bank. However, it is known from the related Vif_{mac} (SIV_{mac} Vif) that it probably binds A3B in the same orientation as Vif_{1} does for A3G.

== Drug target ==
Ever since the 2000s, there has been interest in developing drugs that disarm the virus by inhibiting Vif. A 2018 review lists 17 small molecules capable of stopping viral replication by Vif inhibition, and categorized them into the functional categories of Vif multimerization targeting, A3G-Vif-targeting (two subcategories by the binding interface disrupted), Vif-EloC targeting, and A3G-upregulating. Two of the drugs were further checked for resistance potential. It turns out that the virus can become resistant in laboratory conditions after exposure to increasing amounts of either drug.

In July 2021, the Chinese National Medical Products Administration granted conditional approval to azvudine, which claims to be a dual nucleoside reverse transcriptase inhibitor and HIV-1 Vif inhibitor.

== In other species ==
Vif has been found in other Lentiviruses, including the Simian immunodeficiency virus (SIV), Feline immunodeficiency virus (FIV; Pfam PF05851), Visna virus (MVV) and Caprine arthritis encephalitis virus (Pfam PF07401). The mamallian APOBEC3 enzymes are in an arms race with Vifs found in those viruses, actively evolving and diversifying to escape inactivation. Most Vifs use CBFB with CRL complex (CUL2/5-RBX2-ELOB/C) as the cofactor/adapter, but Visna-maedi virus (MVV) uses CYPA instead of CBFB. Bovine immunodeficiency virus Vif unusually requires none of such adapters.
