= Eugen von Hippel =

German ophthalmologist and author

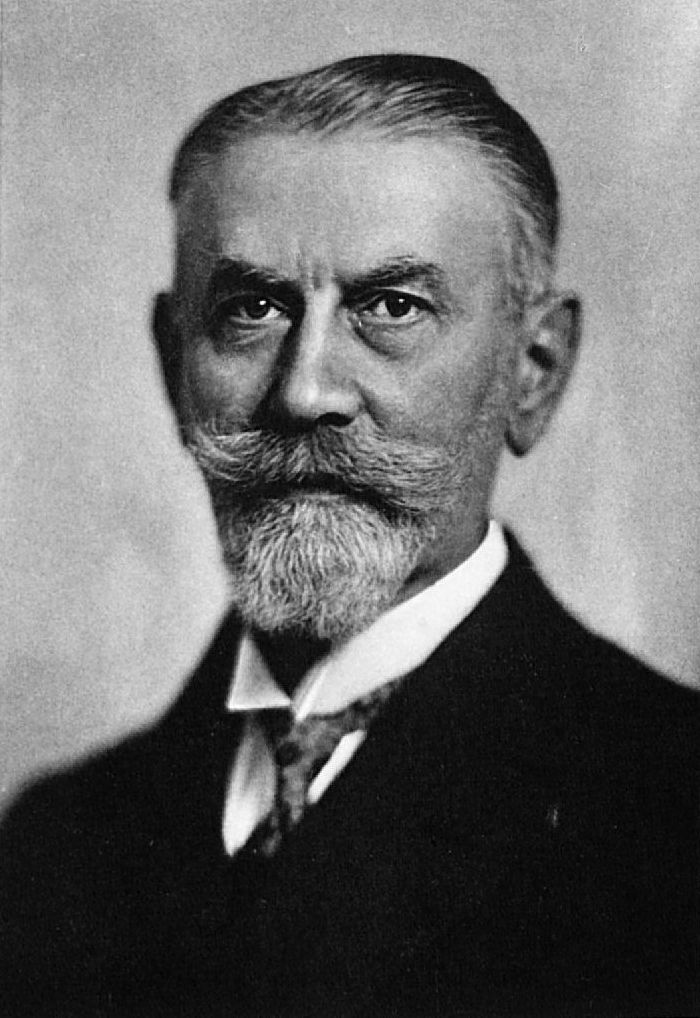
Eugen von Hippel.

Eugen Adolf Arthur von Hippel (3 August 1867 – 4 July 1939) was a German ophthalmologist born in Königsberg.

== Family ==
Eugen is the son of Arthur von Hippel, brother of Robert von Hippel and Richard von Hippel, and uncle of Arthur R. von Hippel.

== Early life, education, and training ==
He studied medicine in Heidelberg under ophthalmologist Theodor Leber (1840–1917) and neurologist Wilhelm Heinrich Erb (1840–1921).

== Career ==
In 1897, Hippel attained the title of "professor extraordinary" at Heidelberg, and in 1909 became a professor at the eye clinic in Halle. In 1914, he became a professor of ophthalmology in Göttingen.

In 1904, Hippel described a rare disorder of the retina, and in 1911 discovered the anatomical basis of this disease, which he named "angiomatosis retinae". However it wasn't until 1926 that Swedish pathologist Arvid Lindau recognized an association between angiomatosis of the retina with hemangioblastomas of the cerebellum and other parts of the central nervous system. This condition is known today as Von Hippel–Lindau disease (VHL).

Hippel contributed several writings to textbooks regarding anatomy and diseases of the eye. He was the son of Arthur von Hippel (1841–1916), a pioneer in corneal transplantation, and an uncle to German-American physicist Arthur R. von Hippel (1898–2003).

== See also ==
- Von Hippel–Lindau disease
- Von Hippel–Lindau tumor suppressor
