= Hemangioblastoma =

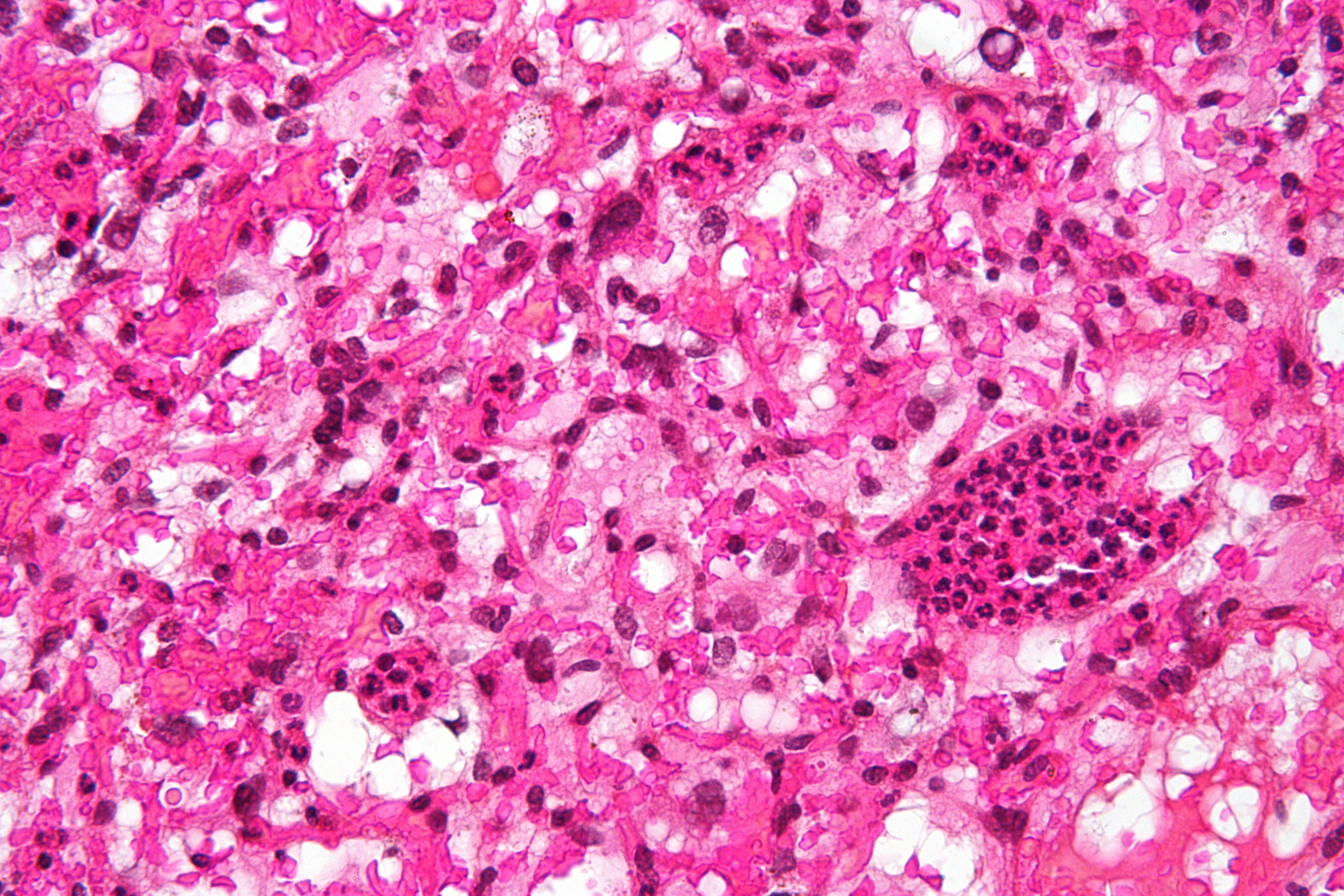
- Micrograph of a cerebellar hemangioblastoma. HPS stain.
- Specialty: Oncology

Hemangioblastomas, or haemangioblastomas, are vascular tumors of the central nervous system that originate from the vascular system, usually during middle age. Sometimes, these tumors occur in other sites such as the spinal cord and retina. They may be associated with other diseases such as polycythemia (increased blood cell count), pancreatic cysts and Von Hippel–Lindau syndrome (VHL syndrome). Hemangioblastomas are most commonly composed of stromal cells in small blood vessels and usually occur in the cerebellum, brainstem or spinal cord. They are classed as grade I tumors under the World Health Organization's classification system.

== Presentation ==
=== Complications ===
Hemangioblastomas can cause an abnormally high number of red blood cells in the bloodstream due to ectopic production of the hormone erythropoietin as a paraneoplastic syndrome.

== Pathogenesis ==
Hemangioblastomas are composed of endothelial cells, pericytes and stromal cells. In VHL syndrome the von Hippel-Lindau protein (pVHL) is dysfunctional, usually due to mutation and/or gene silencing. In normal circumstances, pVHL is involved in the inhibition of hypoxia-inducible factor 1 α (HIF-1α) by ubiquitin mediated proteosomal degradation. In these dysfunctional cells pVHL cannot degrade HIF-1α, causing it to accumulate. HIF-1α causes the production of vascular endothelial growth factor, platelet derived growth factor B, erythropoietin and transforming growth factor alpha, which act to stimulate growth of cells within the tumor.

== Diagnosis ==
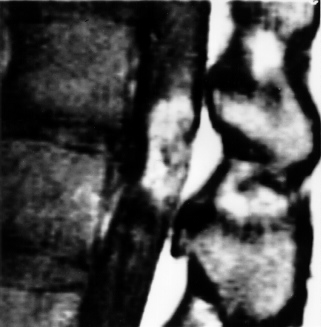
Contrast enhanced MRI of the conus medullaris and cauda equina of patient with VHL depicts a hemangioblastoma of the conus with extension into the nerve roots.

The primary diagnosis is made with a computed tomography scan (CT scan). On a scan, hemangioblastoma shows as a well-defined, low attenuation region in the posterior fossa with an enhancing nodule on the wall. Sometimes multiple lesions are present.

== Treatment ==
The treatment for hemangioblastoma is surgical excision of the tumor. Although usually straightforward to carry out, recurrence of the tumor or more tumors at a different site develop in approximately 20% of patients. Gamma Knife Radiosurgery as well as LINAC have also been employed to successfully treat recurrence and control tumor growth of cerebellar hemangioblastomas.

== Prognosis ==
The outcome for hemangioblastoma is very good if surgical extraction of the tumor can be achieved; excision is possible in most cases and permanent neurologic deficit is uncommon and can be avoided altogether if the tumor is diagnosed and treated early. Persons with VHL syndrome have a bleaker prognosis than those who have sporadic tumors since those with VHL syndrome usually have more than one lesion.

== Epidemiology ==
Hemangioblastoma are among the rarest central nervous system tumors, accounting for less than 2%. Hemangioblastomas usually occur in adults, yet tumors may appear in VHL syndrome at much younger ages. Men and women are approximately at the same risk. Although they can occur in any section of the central nervous system, they usually occur in either side of the cerebellum, the brain stem or the spinal cord.

== Additional images ==
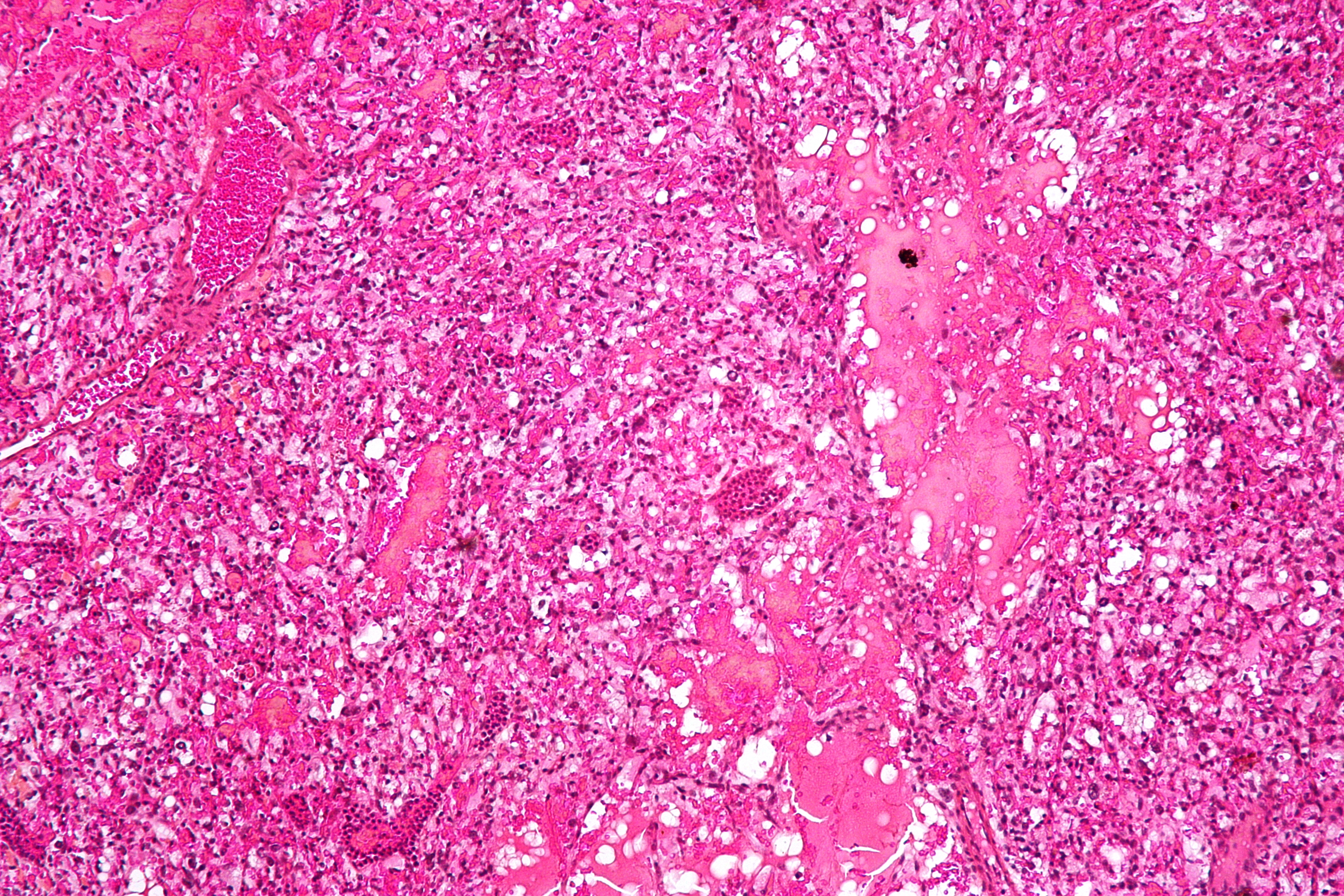
Micrograph of cerebellar hemangioblastoma. HPS stain.

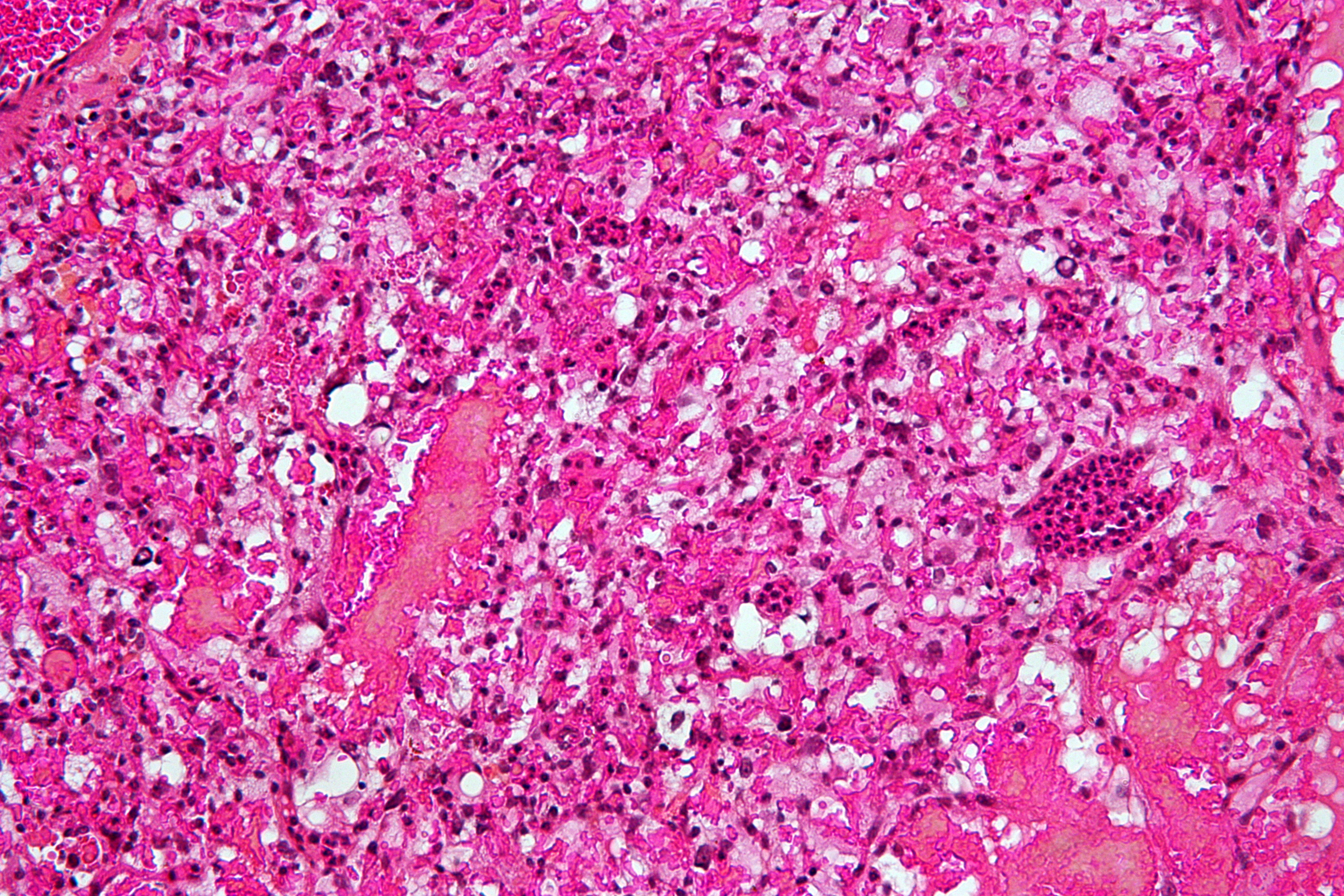
Micrograph of cerebellar hemangioblastoma. HPS stain.
