= Azvudine =

Antiviral drug

Clinical data
- Trade names: 捷倍安, 双新艾克
- Other names: 2′-Deoxy-2′-β-fluoro-4′-azidocytidine (FNC), RO-0622

Legal status
- Legal status: US: Investigational drug; CN: Conditional use Rx

Pharmacokinetic data
- Bioavailability: 83% (rat, dog)
- Metabolism: liver (CYP3A)
- Elimination half-life: 4 hours (dog)

Identifiers
- IUPAC name: 4-Amino-1-[(2R,3S,4R,5R)-5-azido-3-fluoro-4-hydroxy-5-(hydroxymethyl)oxolan-2-yl]pyrimidin-2-one
- CAS Number: 1011529-10-4
- PubChem CID: 24769759
- DrugBank: DB16407
- ChemSpider: 24717759
- UNII: IJ2XP0ID0K
- ChEMBL: ChEMBL519846

Chemical and physical data
- Formula: C_{9}H_{11}FN_{6}O_{4}
- Molar mass: 286.223 g·mol^{−1}
- 3D model (JSmol): Interactive image
- SMILES: C1=CN(C(=O)N=C1N)[C@H]2[C@H]([C@@H]([C@](O2)(CO)N=[N+]=[N-])O)F
- InChI: InChI=1S/C9H11FN6O4/c10-5-6(18)9(3-17,14-15-12)20-7(5)16-2-1-4(11)13-8(16)19/h1-2,5-7,17-18H,3H2,(H2,11,13,19)/t5-,6-,7+,9+/m0/s1; Key:KTOLOIKYVCHRJW-XZMZPDFPSA-N

Azvudine is an antiviral drug which acts as a reverse transcriptase inhibitor. It was discovered for the treatment of hepatitis C and has since been investigated for use against other viral diseases such as AIDS and COVID-19, for which it was granted conditional approval in China.

Azvudine was first discovered in 2007. It costs 350 Chinese yuan per 7 days for COVID, as of November 2022.

== Medical uses ==
In July 2021, azvudine became conditionally approved in China for the following indication: "to treat high-viral-load cases of HIV-1, in combination with a nucleoside reverse-transcriptase inhibitor and a non-nucleoside reverse-transcriptase inhibitor". The approval text describes it as a dual reverse transcriptase and Vif inhibitor.

In July 2022, azvudine received emergency conditional approval for COVID-19 in adults. It is believed to work by inhibiting the RNA-dependent RNA polymerase (RdRp) enzyme in the SARS-CoV-2 virus.

== Adverse effects ==
According to the manufacturer, phase II trials of azvudine in combination with doravirine and tenofovir disoproxil fumarate in HIV patients found an adverse effect profile similar to, but milder, than lamivudine combined with the two drugs. Very common (> 10%) side effects include dizziness, elevated liver enzymes, vomiting, and elevated alkaline phosphatase. Common (> 1%) side effects include nausea, elevated blood lipids, fever, insomnia, tiredness, and diarrhea. Detailed numbers are provided by Genuine in the slides and the medication package insert. A boxed warning is present at the beginning of the Chinese package insert, describing a risk of "decrease in absolute neutrophil count, increase in total bilirubin, increase in glutathione aminotransferase, and increase in blood glucose".

The small (n=10) open-label pilot study for azvudine used alone in COVID reported no adverse events.

=== Non-human models ===
Azvudine is found to be mutagenic in in vitro in the Ames test, CHL test, and in vitro in the mice micronucleus test.

Azvudine is toxic to the reproductive system of rats and rabbit. The minimum reproductive NOAEL found for males is 5.0 mg/kg/d and for females 0.5 mg/kg/d. It is excreted in rat breast milk; the NOAEL for rat pups is 1.5 mg/kg/d.

Azvudine is mainly toxic to the immune system, bone marrow, and digestive system of model animals. The chronic NOAELs are 0.5 mg/kg/d (rat, 3 months), 0.3 mg/kg/d (rat, 26 weeks), and 0.1 mg/kg/d (beagle dog, 1 month and 39 weeks). For comparison, the chronic human dose for HIV treatment is 0.05 mg/kg/d, using the reference 3 mg dose and an average Chinese body mass of 59.5 kg (2014).

== History ==
Azvudine was first found in literature in a patent filed by Chang Jun-biao of Zhengzhou University. It received its current name in 2009, when researchers at Roche independently discovered it as a Hep C RNA polymerase inhibitor in vitro. In the following years, Chinese scientists tested it in vitro for a number of targets, most importantly HBV (human and duck) and HTLV-1, two viruses with a reverse transcriptase.

It was first proposed as an HIV treatment in 2011, when in vitro tests by the Chang group provided positive results. In 2014, its oral pharmokinetics in rats was elucidated. A phase II study (NCT04109183) was finished in March 2019 by Genuine Biotech. In August 2020, the Chang group found that the substance inhibits vif in vitro. In the same month, China's drug regulator (NMPA) decided to fast-track the approval process, labelling it a first-in-class medication. In July 2021, NMPA granted conditional approval for HIV-1. It was included in the 2021 HIV treatment recommendnation by the Chinese Medical Association and Chinese CDC, published October that year. Curiously, no full results of the trial have been made available for this study in any journal detailing the experiment design as of December 2022. Parts of the results are shown on the drug monograph as well as a 2022 slides deck produced by Genuine for the NHSA available on the latter's website.

Azvudine was found to inhibit some coronaviruses in vitro around 2020, leading to an interest in its use in COVID. An open-label pilot study on mild and moderate cases was performed in 2020, with mildly positive results. A phase III trial was performed in 2022 in China. In July 2022, China's drug regulator granted conditional approval for it to be used to treat COVID-19, following a local phase III trial. Initially, no detailed description of the said trial was published in any journals, but state media quoted some numbers from the developer: "40% clinical improvement in 7 days by FNC group, compared to 11% in control". It is unclear how such "improvement" is defined.

Four phase III clinical trials investigated azvudine's efficacy and safety in adults with mild-to-moderate COVID-19. The findings indicate that azvudine may reduce the time to eliminate detectable levels of virus (viral load) and improve symptoms faster than standard treatment. In trials, it was reported to be safe with few side effects. However, some studies produced inconsistent results in terms of symptom improvement and severe illness prevention. Additionally, the studies tended to use a smaller number of participants than other major COVID-19 drug trials.

== Society and culture ==
Genuine owns two different tradenames for this medication: 双新艾克 (literally "dual new AIDS inhibitor") for HIV use and 捷倍安 (literally "fast extra safe") for COVID use. No generics are available.

Geniune holds one patent related to the drug: the original 2007 patent on the entire class of 2'-fluorine-4'-substituted nucleotides, purchased from Zhengzhou University. Two other Chinese patents on synthesizing the drug are found on Google Patents, but the owners do not appear to be connected to Geniune. Roche held one 2002 patent, CNA028118480A (CN1516590A), over the broader class of 4'-substituted nucleotides. The patent was voided in 2019 after Riboscience, its new holder, stopped paying fees.
