= Arvid Lindau =

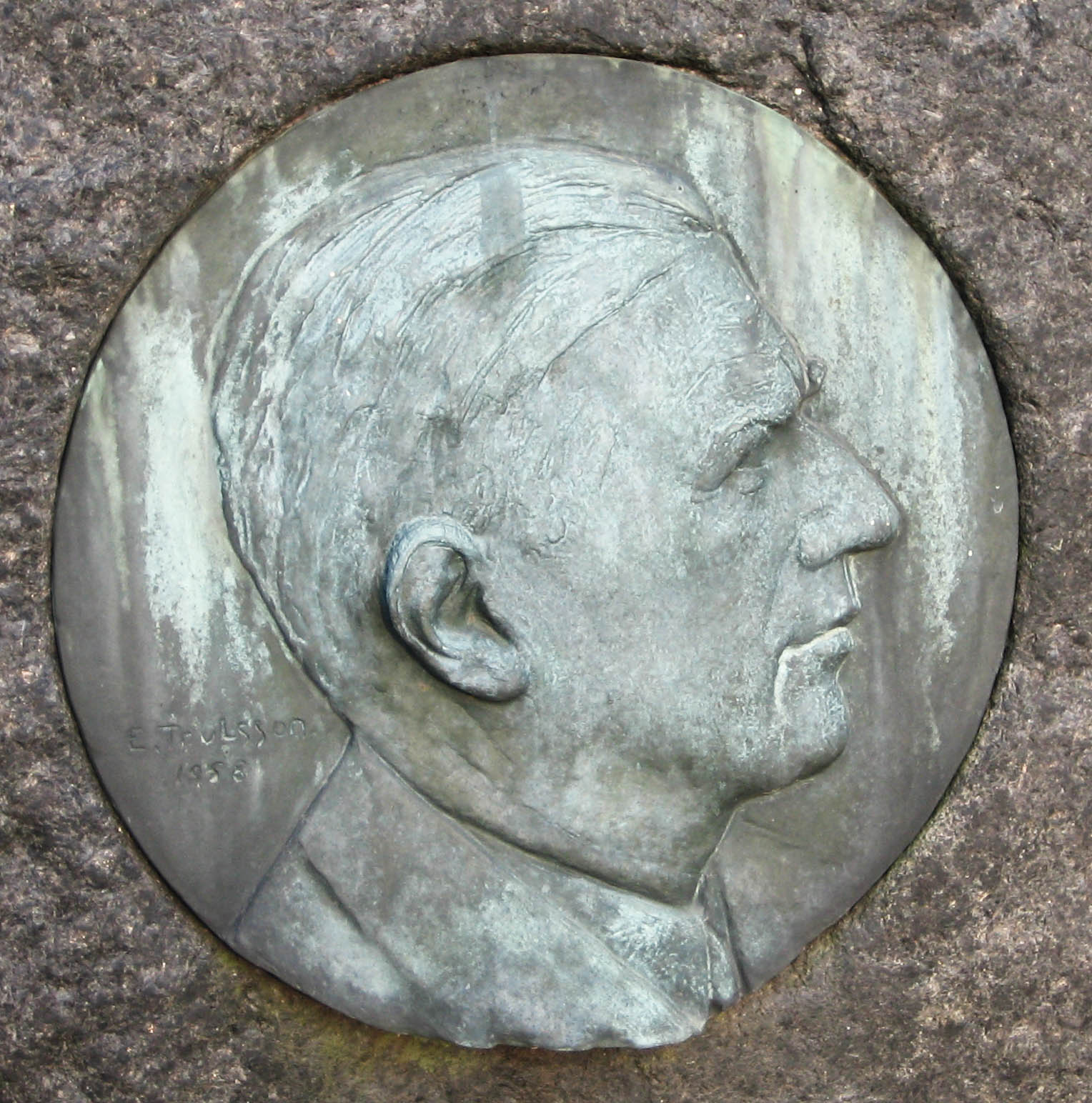
Arvid Lindau

Arvid Vilhelm Lindau (23 July 1892 – 7 September 1958) was a Swedish pathologist and bacteriologist born in Malmö.

Lindau studied medicine at the University of Lund and received his training in bacteriology at the University of Copenhagen and at Harvard (1931/32 as a Rockefeller scholarship holder). In 1933 he succeeded John Forssman (1868–1947) as chair of general pathology, bacteriology and general health science at Lund.

Lindau published more than forty papers on pathology, neurology, and bacteriology. In the latter field, he was involved with issues such as bovine tuberculosis, Boeck's sarcoid and Wasserman reaction, to name a few. At the Institute of Pathological Anatomy in Lund, he wrote an important thesis titled Studien über Kleinhirncysten. Bau, Pathogenese und Beziehungen zur Angiomatosae retinae, in which he described the relationship between cerebellar cysts and their correlation to tumors (angiomata) of the retina.

In 1926, Lindau was the first to describe a coherent link between the retinal, cerebellar and visceral components of a disease he called "angiomatosis of the central nervous system". This disease is characterized by tumors of the retina and the brain, along with cysts of several visceral organs such as the kidneys, pancreas, and adrenal glands. Lindau's research soon attracted the attention of famed neurosurgeon Harvey Cushing, who named the disorder "Lindau's disease". By 1964 the medical community had become more aware of early 20th century research on retinal angiomata conducted by ophthalmologist Eugen von Hippel, and today the disease is named Von Hippel–Lindau disease.

== Partial bibliography ==
- Studien über Kleinhirncysten. Bau, Pathogenese und Beziehungen zur Angiomatosis retinae, (doctoral thesis); Acta pathologica et microbiologica Scandinavica, Copenhagen, 1926, 3 (supplement): 1-128.
- Angiomatosis retinae. Acta pathologica et microbiologica Scandinavica, Copenhagen, 1926, supplement 1: 77.

== See also ==
- Von Hippel–Lindau tumor suppressor – Mammalian protein found in humans

== References and external sources ==
- Information on VHL disease
- VHL Family Alliance (biography of Arvid Lindau)
