= HIF1AN =

Protein-coding gene in the species Homo sapiens

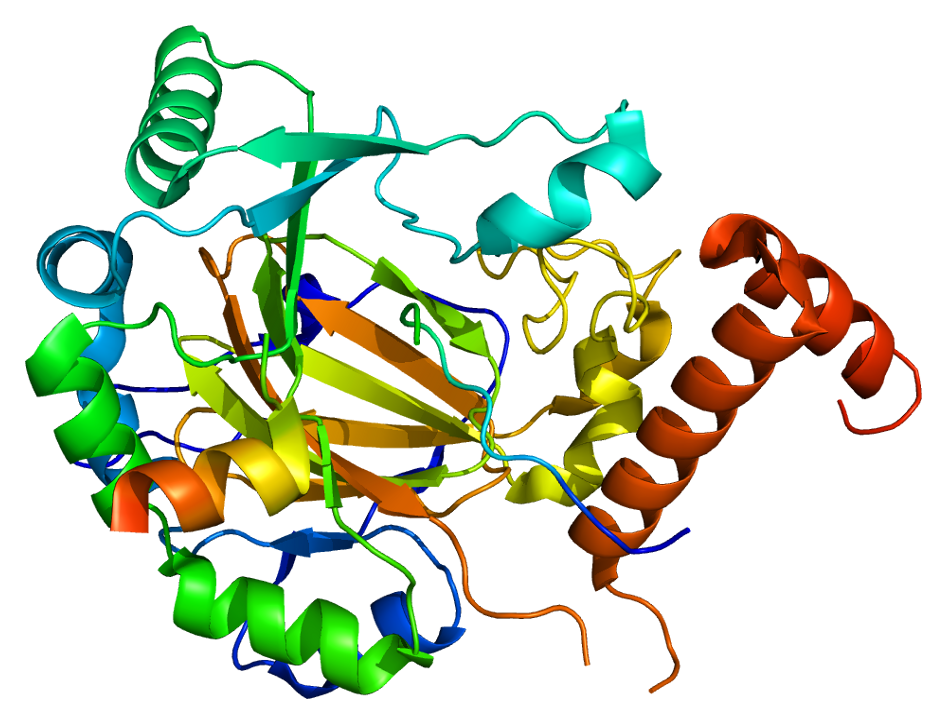

Identifiers
- Aliases: HIF1AN, FIH1, hypoxia inducible factor 1 alpha subunit inhibitor, hypoxia inducible factor 1 subunit alpha inhibitor, HIFAN
- External IDs: OMIM: 606615; MGI: 2442345; GeneCards: HIF1AN
Available structures
PDB	Ortholog search: PDBe RCSB
PDB	List of PDB id codes 1H2K, 1H2L, 1H2M, 1H2N, 1IZ3, 1MZE, 1MZF, 1YCI, 2CGN, 2CGO, 2ILM, 2W0X, 2WA3, 2WA4, 2XUM, 2Y0I, 2YC0, 2YDE, 3D8C, 3KCX, 3KCY, 3OD4, 3P3N, 3P3P, 4AI8, 4B7E, 4B7K, 4BIO, 4JAA, 4NR1, 4Z2W, 4Z1V
Enzyme activity
EC #	BRENDA	ExPASy	KEGG	MetaCyc
1.14.11.30	↗	↗	↗	↗

Gene location (Human)
Chr.	Chromosome 10 (human)
Band	10q24.31	Start	100,529,072 bp
Band	10q24.31	End	100,559,998 bp

Gene location (Mouse)
Chr.	Chromosome 19 (mouse)
Band	19|19 C3	Start	44,551,289 bp
Band	19|19 C3	End	44,564,713 bp
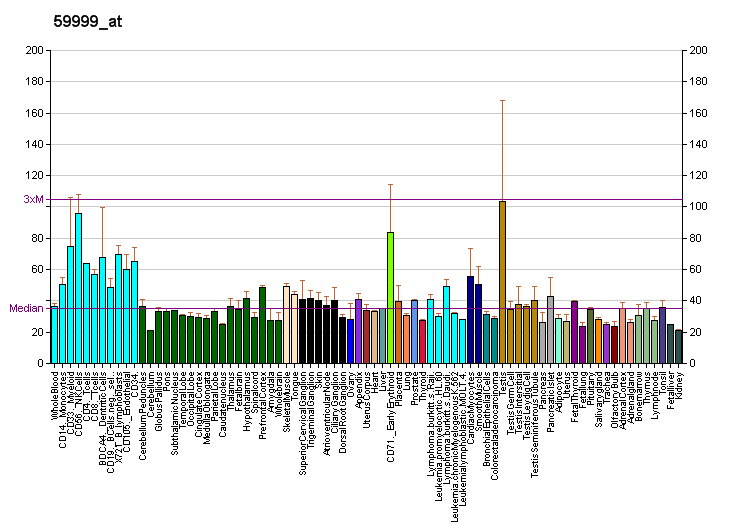

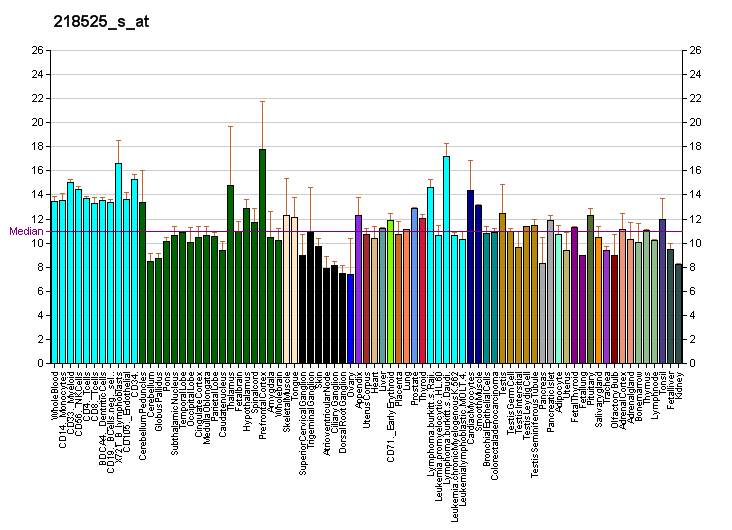
RNA expression pattern
Bgee	Human / Mouse (ortholog); Top expressed in: gastrocnemius muscle; Skeletal muscle tissue of rectus abdominis; muscle of thigh; glutes; tendon of biceps brachii; stromal cell of endometrium; triceps brachii muscle; quadriceps femoris muscle; vastus lateralis muscle; islet of Langerhans / Top expressed in: muscle of thigh; knee joint; skeletal muscle tissue; triceps brachii muscle; vastus lateralis muscle; sternocleidomastoid muscle; tibialis anterior muscle; temporal muscle; digastric muscle; gastrocnemius muscle; More reference expression data
BioGPS	More reference expression data
Gene ontology
Molecular function	iron ion binding; peptidyl-asparagine 3-dioxygenase activity; protein homodimerization activity; ankyrin repeat binding; zinc ion binding; dioxygenase activity; metal ion binding; NF-kappaB binding; Notch binding; protein binding; carboxylic acid binding; oxidoreductase activity; peptidyl-histidine dioxygenase activity; oxygen gasoreceptor activity; 2-oxoglutarate-dependent dioxygenase activity; hypoxia-inducible factor-asparagine oxygenase activity
Cellular component	cytoplasm; nucleoplasm; perinuclear region of cytoplasm; nucleus; cytosol
Biological process	regulation of transcription, DNA-templated; peptidyl-histidine hydroxylation; transcription, DNA-templated; peptidyl-aspartic acid hydroxylation; peptidyl-asparagine hydroxylation; positive regulation of myoblast differentiation; positive regulation of vasculogenesis; regulation of transcription from RNA polymerase II promoter in response to hypoxia; negative regulation of transcription from RNA polymerase II promoter in response to hypoxia; negative regulation of Notch signaling pathway
Sources:Amigo / QuickGO
Orthologs
Databases	NCBI: entry; OMA: entry
Species	Human	Mouse
Entrez	55662	319594
Ensembl	ENSG00000166135	ENSMUSG00000036450
UniProt	Q9NWT6	Q8BLR9
RefSeq (mRNA)	NM_017902	NM_176958
RefSeq (protein)	NP_060372	NP_795932
Location (UCSC)	Chr 10: 100.53 – 100.56 Mb	Chr 19: 44.55 – 44.56 Mb
PubMed search
- Wikidata
View/Edit Human	View/Edit Mouse

Hypoxia-inducible factor 1-alpha inhibitor (FIH) is a protein that in humans is encoded by the HIF1AN gene.

== Interactions ==
FIH has been shown to interact with HIF1A and Von Hippel-Lindau tumor suppressor. Additionally, asparaginyl hydroxylation of HIF1α by FIH-1 (HIF1AN) at N803 impairs its interaction with CBP/P300.
