= CCDC82 =

Protein found in humans

Identifiers
- Aliases: CCDC82, HSPC048, coiled-coil domain containing 82
- External IDs: MGI: 1913646; HomoloGene: 11678; GeneCards: CCDC82; OMA:CCDC82 - orthologs

Gene location (Human)
Chr.	Chromosome 11 (human)
Band	11q21	Start	96,349,241 bp
Band	11q21	End	96,389,956 bp

Gene location (Mouse)
Chr.	Chromosome 9 (mouse)
Band	9|9 A1	Start	13,246,536 bp
Band	9|9 A1	End	13,292,867 bp
RNA expression pattern
Bgee	Human / Mouse (ortholog); Top expressed in: Achilles tendon; corpus callosum; sperm; testicle; cerebellar hemisphere; right hemisphere of cerebellum; tibial nerve; gastric mucosa; pancreatic epithelial cell; right testis / Top expressed in: carotid body; sciatic nerve; mesenteric lymph nodes; paraventricular nucleus of hypothalamus; dorsomedial hypothalamic nucleus; arcuate nucleus; superior colliculus; lateral hypothalamus; mammillary body; iris; More reference expression data
BioGPS	n/a
Orthologs
Species	Human	Mouse
Entrez	79780	66396
Ensembl	ENSG00000149231	ENSMUSG00000079084
UniProt	Q8N4S0	Q6PG04
RefSeq (mRNA)	NM_014148; NM_024725; NM_001318736; NM_001318737; NM_001363594	NM_025534
RefSeq (protein)	NP_001305665; NP_001305666; NP_079001; NP_001350523	NP_079810
Location (UCSC)	Chr 11: 96.35 – 96.39 Mb	Chr 9: 13.25 – 13.29 Mb
PubMed search
- Wikidata
View/Edit Human	View/Edit Mouse

Coiled-Coil Domain Containing protein 82 (CCDC82) is a protein that in humans, is encoded for by the gene of the same name, CCDC82. The CCDC82 gene is expressed in nearly all of human tissues at somewhat low rates. As of today, there are no patents involving CCDC82 and the function remains unknown.

== Gene ==
CCDC82 is located on chromosome 11 at 11q21.5. It contains two domains of unknown function, DUF4196 and DUF4211. The DNA sequence is 37,155 base pairs long and contains 7 exons.

=== Homology ===
CCDC82 is present in many orthologs. It is conserved throughout other mammals, reptiles, birds and bony fish. It is not found in invertebrates, bacteria or fungi. There are no paralogs.

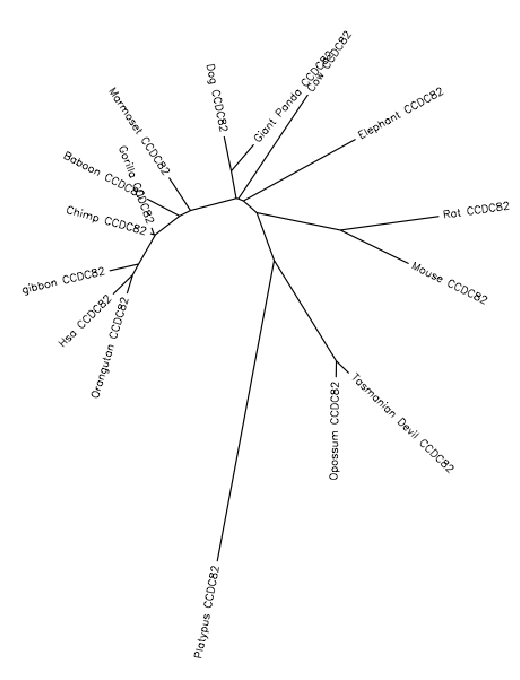
Unrooted phylogenetic tree

Scientific name	Common name	Date of divergence	Accession number	Length	Percent identity	Percent similarity
Pan troglodytes	Chimpanzee	6.3 Mya	XP_001147806.1	544 aa	60.8	99
Gorilla gorilla gorilla	Gorilla	8.8 Mya	XP_004052053.1	521 aa	56.2	91
Pongo pygmaeus	Orangutan	15.7 Mya	NP_003253075.1	343 aa	95.3	98
Nomascus leucogenys	Crested gibbon	20.4 Mya	XP_003253075.1	554 aa	57.8	94
Papio anubis	Olive baboon	29 Mya	XP_003910631.1	542 aa	52	86
Callithrix jacchus	Marmoset	42.6 Mya	XP_002754732.1	526 aa	51.2	86
Mus musculus	Mouse	92.3 Mya	NP_079810.2	518 aa	39.7	74
Rattus norvegicus	Brown rat	92.3 Mya	NP_001007661.1	516 aa	37.4	71
Canis lupus familiaris	Dog	94.2 Mya	XP_542232.2	520 aa	46	79
Bos taurus	Cow	94.2 Mya	NP_001039559.2	522 aa	42.4	74
Ailuropoda melanoleuca	Giant panda	94.2 Mya	XP_002925755.1	528 aa	45.4	80
Loxodonta africana	African bush elephant	98.7 Mya	XP_003415705.1	521 aa	40.4	75
Sarcophilus harrisii	Tasmanian devil	162.2 Mya	XP_003764344.1	518 aa	36.9	70
Monodelphis domestica	Gray short-tailed opossum	162.2 Mya	XP_001363143.1	516 aa	36.7	72
Ornithorhynchus anatinus	Platypus	167.4 Mya	XP_001511067.1	505 aa	26.6	70
Gallus gallus	Chicken	296 Mya	XP_423807.3	460 aa	24.3	56
Meleagris gallopavo	Wild turkey	296 Mya	XP_003203546.1	462 aa	21.5	70
Taeniopygia guttata	Zebra finch	296 Mya	XP_002198267.1	575 aa	20	61
Anolis carolinensis	Carolina anole	296 Mya	XP_003219357.1	603 aa	19.9	49
Xenopus tropicalis	Western clawed frog	371.2 Mya	XP_002935613.1	462 aa	21	73

== mRNA ==
=== Promoter ===
The predicted promoter for CCDC82 is located on the minus strand and spans from base pairs 96,122,963 to 96,123,587. It is 625 base pairs long.

=== Transcription factors ===
The transcription factors listed below are for the predicted promoter sequence and are located on the minus strand.

Detailed Family Information	Span	Score
Alternative splicing variant of FOXP1	48-64	1.00
Homeodomain transcription factor Otx2	34-50	.992
Hypoxia-response Elements	111-127	.985
Homeobox A10/HOX 1.8	52-68	.957
SRY box 9	80-104	.947
Mesoderm posterior 1 and 2	42-62	.937
c-Myc/Max heterodimer	44-60	.929
SAM pointed domain containing ets transcription factor	27-47	.923
cAMP-responsive element binding protein	134-154	.917
PR domain zinc finger protein 14	138-152	.912

== Protein ==
The protein it encodes for is 344 amino acids in length. The protein itself is very acidic and is very rich in aspartic acid and glutamic acid. It is also very deficient in alanine, containing only two alanines in the entire sequence. The alanines are located adjacent to each other, amino acid number 233 and 234. Alanine 233 is highly conserved throughout the orthologs. The molecular weight is 40.0 kdal and the isoelectric point is 4.383

=== Expression ===
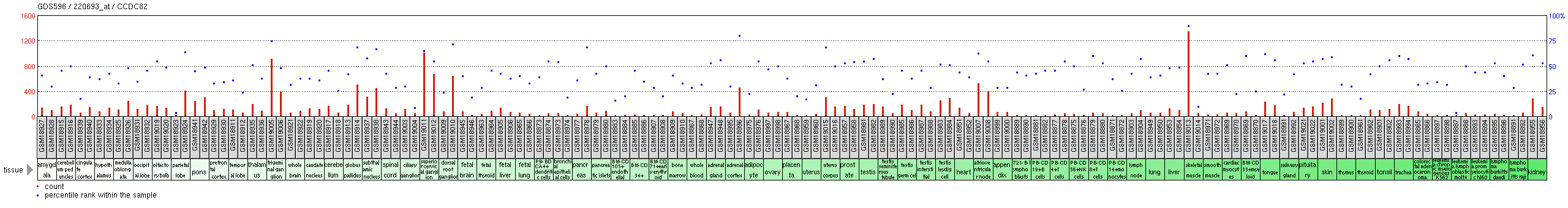
This image shows the level of expression of CCDC82 in different tissues throughout the body.

CCDC82 is found in nearly all tissues in the human body, however it is present in higher quantities in the skeletal muscles, adrenal cortex, and the trigeminal ganglion.

=== Post translational modifications ===
CCDC82 has several predicted phosphorylation sites. There are 32 predicted serine phosphorylation sites, 5 threonine, and 3 tyrosine.

=== Interactions ===
CCDC82 is known to interact with two proteins. It indirectly interacts with VHL, a gene that encodes for a tumor suppressor and ubiquitin protein ligase. It also interacts with EWSR1, which functions as a transcriptional repressor.

== Clinical significance ==
CCDC82 is a circulat-responsive gene. Circulat is a product designed to restore systemic vascular health. It is a plant based product and taken by patients who suffer from diabetes or circulatory problems.

=== Possible function ===
Based on the information that CCDC82 is affected by the Circulat product it could be hypothesized that CCDC82 is involved in circulatory function. However, this is purely speculation.
