= Bacillary angiomatosis =

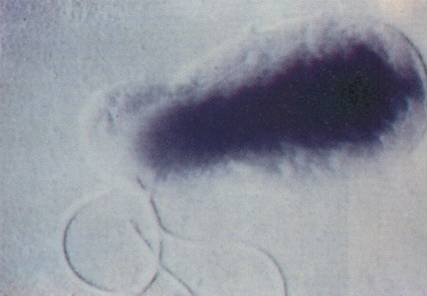
- Bartonella sp. (bacterial species which causes this condition)
- Specialty: Infectious diseases

Bacillary angiomatosis (BA) is a form of angiomatosis associated with bacteria of the genus Bartonella.

== Signs and symptoms ==
Cutaneous BA is characterised by the presence of lesions on or under the skin. Appearing in numbers from one to hundreds, these lesions may take several forms:

- papules or nodules which are red, globular, and non-blanching, with a vascular appearance
- purplish nodules sufficiently similar to Kaposi's sarcoma that a biopsy may be required to verify which of the two it is
- a purplish lichenoid plaque
- a subcutaneous nodule which may have ulceration, similar to a bacterial abscess

While cutaneous BA is the most common form, it can also affect several other parts of the body, such as the brain, bone, bone marrow, lymph nodes, gastrointestinal tract, respiratory tract, spleen, and liver. Symptoms vary depending on which parts of the body are affected; for example, those whose livers are affected may have an enlarged liver and fever, while those with osseous BA experience intense pain in the affected area.

=== Presentation ===
BA is characterised by the proliferation of blood vessels, resulting in them forming tumour-like masses in the skin and other organs.

== Causes ==
It is caused by either Bartonella henselae or B. quintana.

- B. henselae is most often transmitted through a cat scratch or bite, though ticks and fleas may also act as vectors.
- B. quintana is usually transmitted by lice.

It can manifest in people with AIDS and rarely appears in those who are immunocompetent.

== Diagnosis ==
Diagnosis is based on a combination of clinical features and biopsy.

Neutrophilic infiltrate.

== Treatment and prevention ==
While curable, BA is potentially fatal if not treated. BA responds dramatically to several antibiotics. Usually, erythromycin will cause the skin lesions to gradually fade away in the next four weeks, resulting in complete recovery. Doxycycline may also be used. However, if the infection does not respond to either of these, the medication is usually changed to tetracycline. If the infection is serious, then a bactericidal medication may be coupled with the antibiotics

If a cat is carrying Bartonella henselae, then it may not exhibit any symptoms. Cats may be bacteremic for weeks to years, but infection is more common in young cats. Transmission to humans is thought to occur via flea feces inoculated into a cat scratch or bite, and transmission between cats occurs only in the presence of fleas. Therefore, elimination and control of fleas in the cat's environment are key to the prevention of infection in both cats and humans.

== History ==
The condition that later became known as bacillary angiomatosis was first described by Stoler and associates in 1983. Being unaware of its infectious origin, it was originally called epithelioid angiomatosis. Following documentation of bacilli in Warthin-Starry stains and by electron microscopy in a series of cases by LeBoit and colleagues, the term bacillary angiomatosis was widely adopted.

== See also ==
- Cat scratch fever
- Trench fever
- Angiomatosis
