= Robert von Hippel =

German jurist and University lecturer (1866–1951)

Robert Wilhelm Ferdinand von Hippel (8 July 1866 - 16 June 1951) was a German jurist and University lecturer born in Königsberg.

== Family ==
Robert was the son of Arthur von Hippel (physician) and elder brother of Eugen von Hippel and Richard von Hippel (1869-1918). He married Emma Bremer (1871-1925) in Strasbourg during 1894 and was the father of four children, including German-American physicist Arthur R. von Hippel. After the death of his first wife, he married Johanna von Koenen (1882-1965), the daughter of Adolf von Koenen, in Göttingen during 1927.

== Career ==
After graduating from high school, he devoted himself to studying law at the University of Marburg, and in 1888 he obtained a doctorate in law. He subsequently worked as a trainee lawyer before becoming an assistant to Franz von Liszt in 1889. He became a professor at University of Kiel in 1891 and University of Strasbourg in 1892, before becoming a professor of criminal law at University of Rostock in 1895. He finally became a professor at the University of Göttingen in 1899. In 1914, he was promoted to privy councillor of justice.

== Works ==
- Die Vorschläge zur Einführung der bedingten Verurtheilung in Deutschland, Enke, 1890
- Aktenstücke zum Strafprozess für Lehrzwecke, S. Hirzel, 1898
- Willensfreiheit und Strafrecht, I. Guttentag, 1903
- Verbrechen und Vergehen wider die öffentliche Ordnung, Liebmann, 1906
- Deutsches Strafrecht, 2 Bände, J. Springer, 1925–1930
- Die Entstehung der modernen Freiheitsstrafe und des Erziehungs-Strafvollzugs, Thüringische Gefängnisgesellschaft, 1931
- Der deutsche Strafprozeß: Lehrbuch, Elwert’sche Verlagsbuchhandlung, 1941
