= Arthur von Hippel (physician) =

German ophthalmologist (1841–1916)

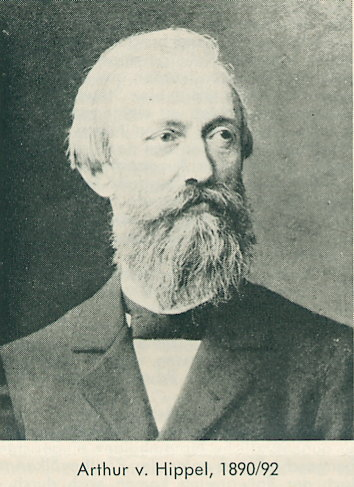

Arthur von Hippel (24 October 1841 – 26 October 1916) was a German ophthalmologist who was a native of Fischhausen, East Prussia. He was the father of criminal lawyer Robert von Hippel (1866–1951), ophthalmologist Eugen von Hippel (1867–1938) and surgeon Richard von Hippel (1869–1918).

Arthur von Hippel studied medicine at the University of Königsberg, the Ludwig-Maximilians-Universität München, and the Friedrich Wilhelm University of Berlin, where he earned his doctorate in 1864. Following graduation, he furthered his training in Prague, and afterwards became an assistant at the eye clinic at the University of Königsberg. In 1879, he became a "full professor" of ophthalmology at the University of Giessen, and in 1890 returned as a professor to the University of Königsberg. In 1892, he attained the chair of ophthalmology at the University of Halle, and in 1901 went to the University of Göttingen, where he was director of the newly founded University Eye Clinic. He retired in 1914, and was replaced at the University of Göttingen eye clinic by his son Eugen.

Von Hippel made contributions in his research of intraocular pressure, color blindness and near-sightedness, but is remembered for his pioneer work in lamellar keratoplasty. In 1886, he grafted a full-thickness cornea from a rabbit into the lamellar bed of a young female patient. After the operation the girl was able to count fingers at a distance of two meters, for a visual acuity of 20/200. He is also credited for the invention of a mechanized trephine for corneal procedures. This device became the prototype for trephines that are used in ophthalmology today.

- Note: Arthur von Hippel is sometimes confused with his grandson Arthur Robert von Hippel (1898–2003), a German-American physicist.
