= Angiomatosis =

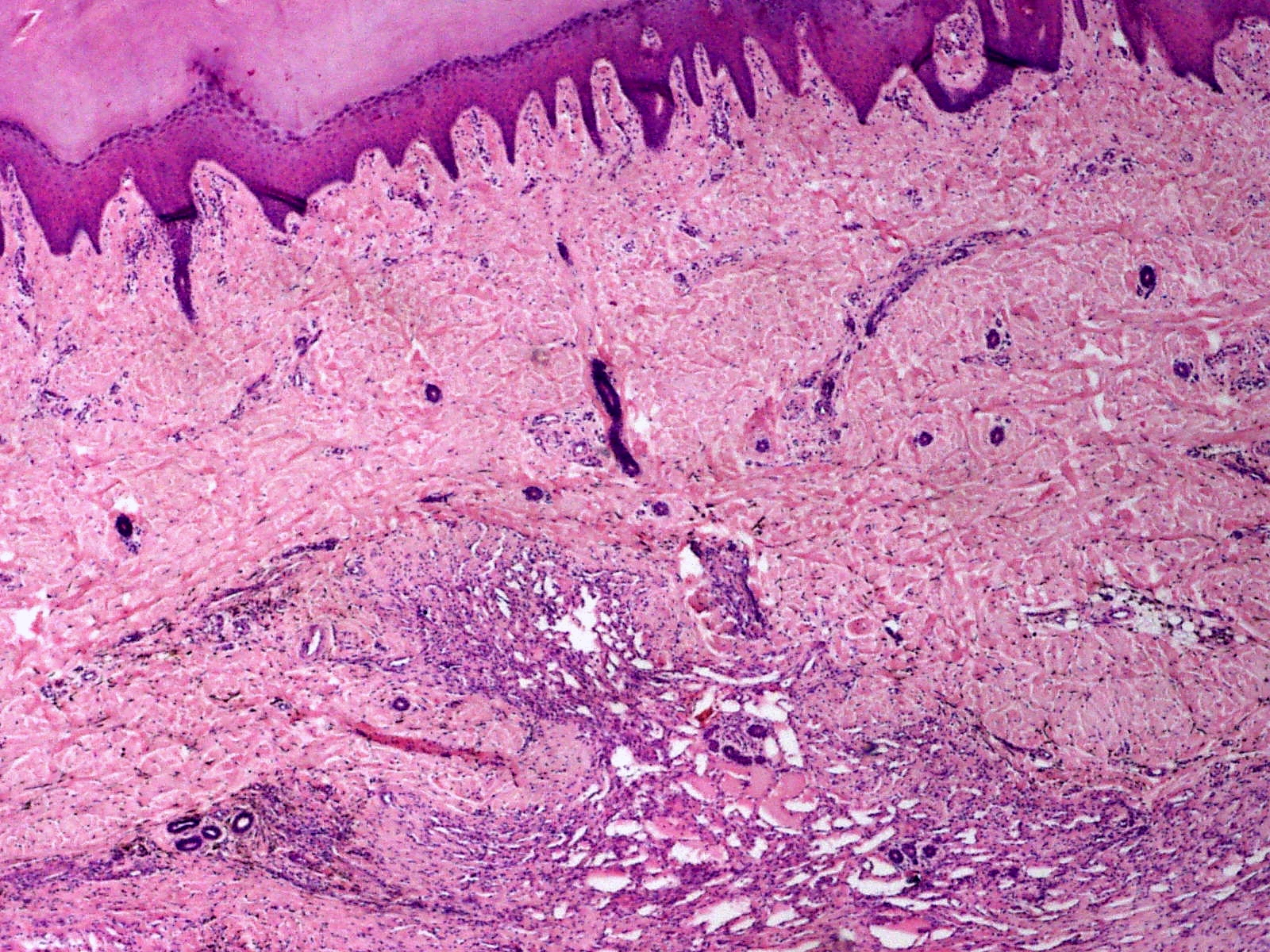
- Skin angiomatosis
- Specialty: Cardiology

Angiomatosis is a non-neoplastic condition characterised by nests of proliferating capillaries arranged in a lobular pattern, displacing adjacent muscle and fat. It consists of many angiomas.

== Presentation ==
=== Associated ===
They often appear in:

- Von Hippel–Lindau disease: It can be associated with Von Hippel–Lindau disease and is a rare genetic multi-system disorder characterized by the abnormal growth of tumours in the body. Symptoms may include headaches, problems with balance and walking, dizziness, weakness of the limbs, vision problems and high blood pressure.
- Bacillary angiomatosis
- Klippel–Trénaunay syndrome
- Sturge–Weber syndrome

== Histology ==
It is a vascular malformation wherein blood vessels proliferate along with accompanying mature fat and fibrous tissue, lymphatics and sometimes nerves. They may involve skin, subcutaneous tissue, skeletal muscle and occasionally bone.

== Prognosis ==
Prognosis depends on the size and location of the tumour, untreated angiomatosis may lead to blindness and/ or permanent brain damage. Death may occur, with complications in the kidney or brain.

== See also ==
- Angioma
- Hemangioma
- List of skin conditions
