= Polycystic disease =

A polycystic disease is a disease that involves multiple cysts scattered throughout an organ, including:

- Polycystic kidney disease
- Polycystic liver disease
- Polyendocrine metabolic ovarian syndrome, formerly called polycystic ovary syndrome
