= Arthur R. von Hippel =

German physicist (1898–2003)

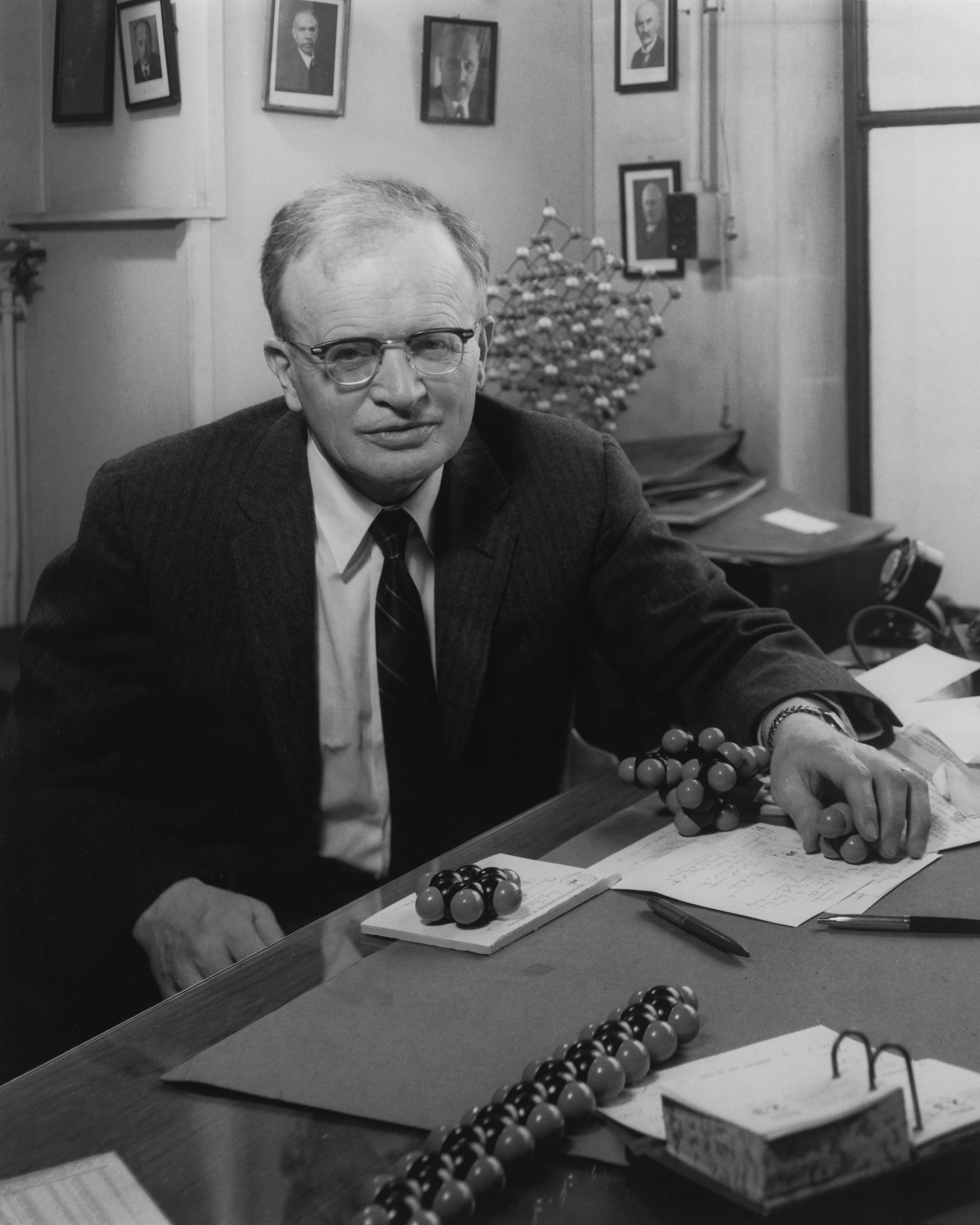
- Hippel in 1959 at MIT
- Born: November 19, 1898; Rostock, Germany
- Died: December 31, 2003 (aged 105); Boston, Massachusetts, U.S.
- Citizenship: American
- Education: University of Göttingen
- Known for: Codeveloping radar during World War II; Discovering the ferroelectric and piezoelectric properties of barium titanate
- Awards: President's Certificate of Merit
- Scientific career
- Fields: Physics
- Workplaces: Niels Bohr Institute, MIT
- Thesis: Thermo-Mikrophone (1924)
- Doctoral advisor: James Franck
- Doctoral students: Jay Last

Notes
- His uncle, Eugen von Hippel described the ophthalmic hemangiomata that are part of von Hippel–Lindau disease, which bears his name. His son, Eric von Hippel, is an MIT economist.

Arthur Robert von Hippel (November 19, 1898 – December 31, 2003) was a German American materials scientist and physicist. Von Hippel was a pioneer in the study of dielectrics, ferromagnetic and ferroelectric materials, and semiconductors and was a codeveloper of radar during World War II.

== Early life ==
Von Hippel was born in Rostock, Mecklenburg-Schwerin, on November 19, 1898, and was the son of Robert von Hippel. He graduated in physics from the University of Göttingen, where David Hilbert, Richard Courant, Robert Pohl, and the Nobel Prize winners Peter Debye, Max Born, and Gustav Hertz were among his teachers in mathematics and physics. He received his Ph.D. in physics in 1924 under the Nobel Prize winner James Franck who in 1930 became his father-in-law by marriage with Franck's daughter Dagmar.

== Career and achievements ==
In 1933, with the ascension of Nazis to power in Germany, von Hippel decided to move to another country, mainly because his wife was Jewish, but due also to his political stance against the new regime. In 1934 he was able to secure a position with the university at Istanbul, Turkey, then spent a year in Denmark, working at the Niels Bohr Institute in Copenhagen. In 1936, accepting an invitation by Karl Compton, von Hippel moved again, this time to the United States, and became an assistant professor at the Massachusetts Institute of Technology. During this time, he studied the properties and behavior of high voltage gas discharges, using positive and negative Lichtenberg figures recorded on photographic film. In 1940 he founded the Laboratory for Insulation Research, which soon became one of the most important research and education centers in this area in the world.

Together with the MIT Radiation Laboratory, von Hippel and his collaborators helped to develop radar technology during the war. He was awarded the President's Certificate of Merit in 1948 by U.S. President Harry Truman. He became famous also for his discovery of ferroelectric and piezoelectric properties of barium titanate (BaTiO_{3}).

During the war the results on dielectrics obtained by the Laboratory for Insulation Research were classified information. After the war these results were prepared for publication. In 1954 von Hippel published Dielectrics and Waves and assembled Dielectric Materials and Applications with 22 collaborators. The Laboratory for Insulation Research also published several technical reports.

Arthur introduced his ideas of designing materials with properties prescribed for the purpose at hand, or molecular engineering, in 1956 in an article that discussed impurities and dislocations in materials, and the use of imperfections. He edited the volume Molecular Science and Molecular Engineering (1959).

The premier award of the Materials Research Society is named in his honor.

== Later life ==
He died at 105 years of age, in 2003. His son, Frank N. von Hippel is a theoretical physicist and professor of Public Policy at Princeton University. Another son, Eric von Hippel, is a professor at the MIT Sloan School of Management who has done pioneering research on user innovation. His uncle, Eugen von Hippel, described the ophthalmic hemangiomata that are part of Von Hippel–Lindau disease, which bears his name.

== In historical fiction ==
Von Hippel is briefly mentioned in Ayşe Kulin's historical novel Without a Country as one of the German scientists who took an academic position in Turkey while fleeing Nazi Germany.
