= ELOB =

Protein-coding gene in the species Homo sapiens

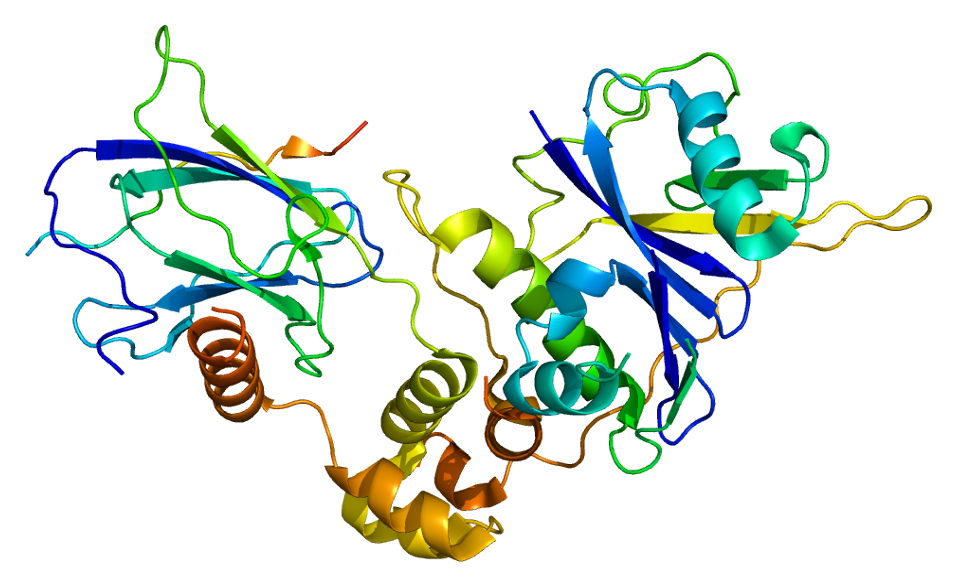
Available structures
PDB	Human UniProt search: PDBe RCSB
PDB	List of PDB id codes 1LM8, 1LQB, 1VCB, 2C9W, 2IZV, 2JZ3, 2MA9, 3DCG, 3ZKJ, 3ZNG, 3ZRC, 3ZRF, 3ZTC, 3ZTD, 3ZUN, 4AJY, 4AWJ, 4B95, 4B9K, 4BKS, 4BKT, 4N9F, 4W9C, 4W9D, 4W9E, 4W9F, 4W9G, 4W9H, 4W9I, 4W9J, 4W9K, 4W9L, 4WQO, 5BO4

Identifiers
- Aliases: ELOB, SIII, TCEB2, transcription elongation factor B subunit 2, elongin B
- External IDs: OMIM: 600787; HomoloGene: 134544; GeneCards: ELOB; OMA:ELOB - orthologs

Gene location (Human)
Chr.	Chromosome 16 (human)
Band	16p13.3	Start	2,771,414 bp
Band	16p13.3	End	2,777,289 bp
RNA expression pattern
Bgee	Human / Mouse (ortholog); Top expressed in: left testis; right testis; apex of heart; muscle of thigh; stromal cell of endometrium; anterior pituitary; nucleus accumbens; olfactory zone of nasal mucosa; prefrontal cortex; ganglionic eminence / n/a; More reference expression data
BioGPS	n/a
Gene ontology
Molecular function	protein binding; ubiquitin protein ligase binding
Cellular component	Cul2-RING ubiquitin ligase complex; cytosol; Cul5-RING ubiquitin ligase complex; VCB complex; nucleus; elongin complex; nucleoplasm
Biological process	transcription elongation from RNA polymerase II promoter; regulation of transcription, DNA-templated; transcription by RNA polymerase II; transcription, DNA-templated; regulation of transcription from RNA polymerase II promoter in response to hypoxia; protein ubiquitination; post-translational protein modification; protein-containing complex assembly
Sources:Amigo / QuickGO
Orthologs
Species	Human	Mouse
Entrez	6923	n/a
Ensembl	ENSG00000103363	n/a
UniProt	Q15370	n/a
RefSeq (mRNA)	NM_207013; NM_007108	n/a
RefSeq (protein)	NP_009039; NP_996896	n/a
Location (UCSC)	Chr 16: 2.77 – 2.78 Mb	n/a
PubMed search		n/a
- Wikidata
View/Edit Human

Elongin B is a protein that in humans is encoded by the ELOB gene.

== Function ==
Elongin B is a subunit of the transcription factor B (SIII) complex. The SIII complex is composed of elongins A/A2, B and C. It activates elongation by RNA polymerase II by suppressing transient pausing of the polymerase at many sites within transcription units. Elongin A functions as the transcriptionally active component of the SIII complex, whereas elongins B and C are regulatory subunits. Elongin A2 is specifically expressed in the testis, and capable of forming a stable complex with elongins B and C. The von Hippel-Lindau tumor suppressor protein binds to elongins B and C, and thereby inhibits transcription elongation. Two alternatively spliced transcript variants encoding different isoforms have been described for this gene.

== Interactions ==
TCEB2 has been shown to interact with:

- CUL2,
- TCEB1, and
- Von Hippel-Lindau tumor suppressor.
