= ELOC =

Protein-coding gene in the species Homo sapiens

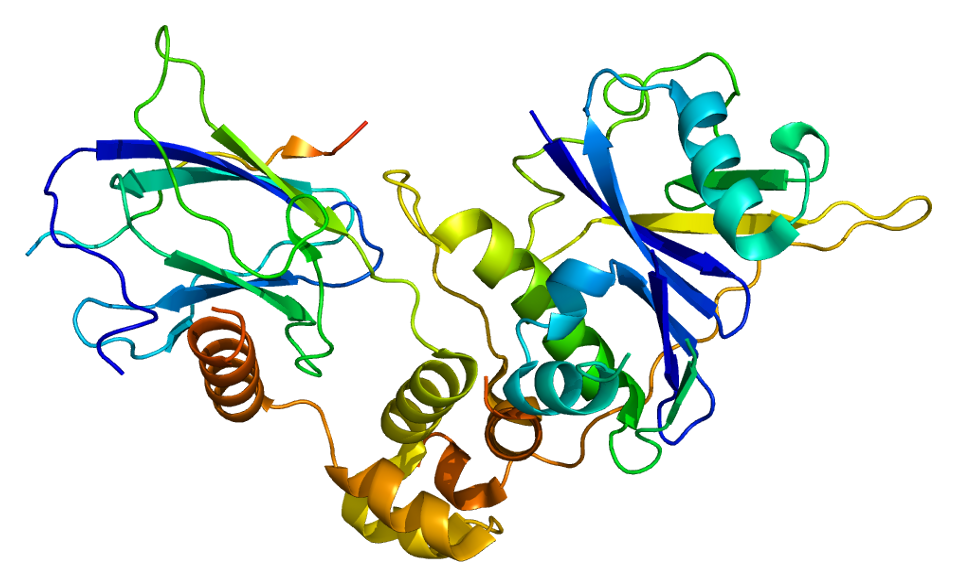
Available structures
PDB	Ortholog search: PDBe RCSB
PDB	List of PDB id codes 1LM8, 1LQB, 1VCB, 2C9W, 2IZV, 2MA9, 3DCG, 3ZKJ, 3ZNG, 3ZRC, 3ZRF, 3ZTC, 3ZTD, 3ZUN, 4AJY, 4AWJ, 4B95, 4B9K, 4BKS, 4BKT, 4N9F, 4W9C, 4W9D, 4W9E, 4W9F, 4W9G, 4W9H, 4W9I, 4W9J, 4W9K, 4W9L, 4WQO, 5BO4

Identifiers
- Aliases: ELOC, SIII, eloC, TCEB1, transcription elongation factor B subunit 1, elongin C
- External IDs: OMIM: 600788; MGI: 1915173; HomoloGene: 38083; GeneCards: ELOC; OMA:ELOC - orthologs

Gene location (Human)
Chr.	Chromosome 8 (human)
Band	8q21.11	Start	73,939,169 bp
Band	8q21.11	End	73,972,307 bp

Gene location (Mouse)
Chr.	Chromosome 1 (mouse)
Band	1|1 A3	Start	16,711,949 bp
Band	1|1 A3	End	16,727,266 bp
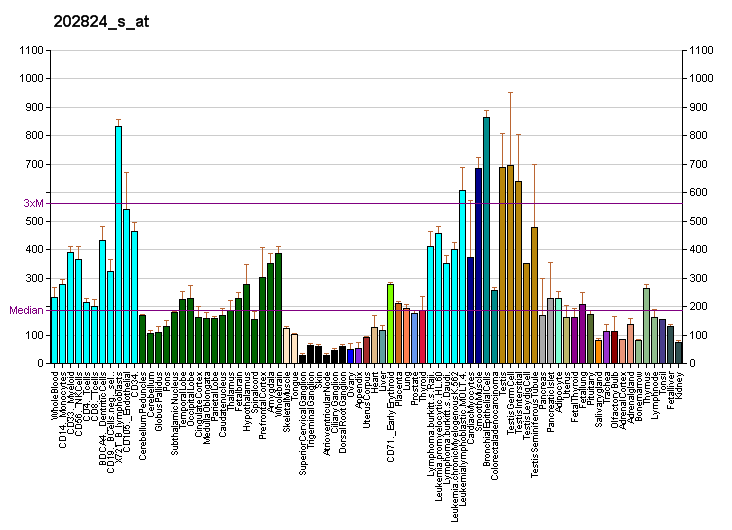

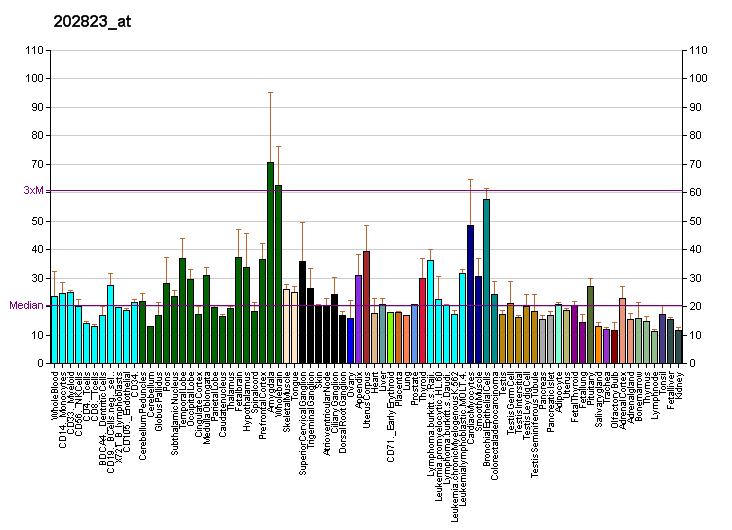
RNA expression pattern
Bgee	Human / Mouse (ortholog); Top expressed in: oocyte; sperm; right ventricle; gingival epithelium; palpebral conjunctiva; left testis; right testis; tendon of biceps brachii; biceps brachii; amniotic fluid / Top expressed in: morula; primary oocyte; blastocyst; primitive streak; endothelial cell of lymphatic vessel; epithelium of stomach; yolk sac; facial motor nucleus; medial ganglionic eminence; atrioventricular valve; More reference expression data
BioGPS	More reference expression data
Gene ontology
Molecular function	protein binding; ubiquitin-protein transferase activity
Cellular component	cytosol; nucleus; elongin complex; nucleoplasm
Biological process	regulation of transcription by RNA polymerase II; transcription elongation from RNA polymerase II promoter; regulation of transcription, DNA-templated; transcription by RNA polymerase II; ubiquitin-dependent protein catabolic process; transcription, DNA-templated; regulation of transcription from RNA polymerase II promoter in response to hypoxia; viral process; positive regulation of transcription elongation from RNA polymerase II promoter; post-translational protein modification; protein ubiquitination
Sources:Amigo / QuickGO
Orthologs
Species	Human	Mouse
Entrez	6921	67923
Ensembl	ENSG00000154582	ENSMUSG00000079658
UniProt	Q15369	P83940
RefSeq (mRNA)	NM_001204857; NM_001204858; NM_001204859; NM_001204860; NM_001204861 NM_001204862; NM_001204863; NM_001204864; NM_005648	NM_001310470; NM_026456
RefSeq (protein)	NP_001191786; NP_001191787; NP_001191788; NP_001191789; NP_001191790 NP_001191791; NP_001191792; NP_001191793; NP_005639	NP_001297399; NP_080732
Location (UCSC)	Chr 8: 73.94 – 73.97 Mb	Chr 1: 16.71 – 16.73 Mb
PubMed search
- Wikidata
View/Edit Human	View/Edit Mouse

Elongin C is a protein that in humans is encoded by the ELOC gene.

== Function ==
Elongin C is a subunit of the transcription factor B (SIII) complex. The SIII complex is composed of elongins A/A2, B and C. It activates elongation by RNA polymerase II by suppressing transient pausing of the polymerase at many sites within transcription units. Elongin A functions as the transcriptionally active component of the SIII complex, whereas elongins B and C are regulatory subunits. Elongin A2 is specifically expressed in the testis, and capable of forming a stable complex with elongins B and C. The von Hippel-Lindau tumor suppressor protein binds to elongins B and C, and thereby inhibits transcription elongation.

== Interactions ==
TCEB1 has been shown to interact with:

- TCEB2 and
- Von Hippel-Lindau tumor suppressor.
