= Von Hippel–Lindau tumor suppressor =

Mammalian protein found in humans

VHL
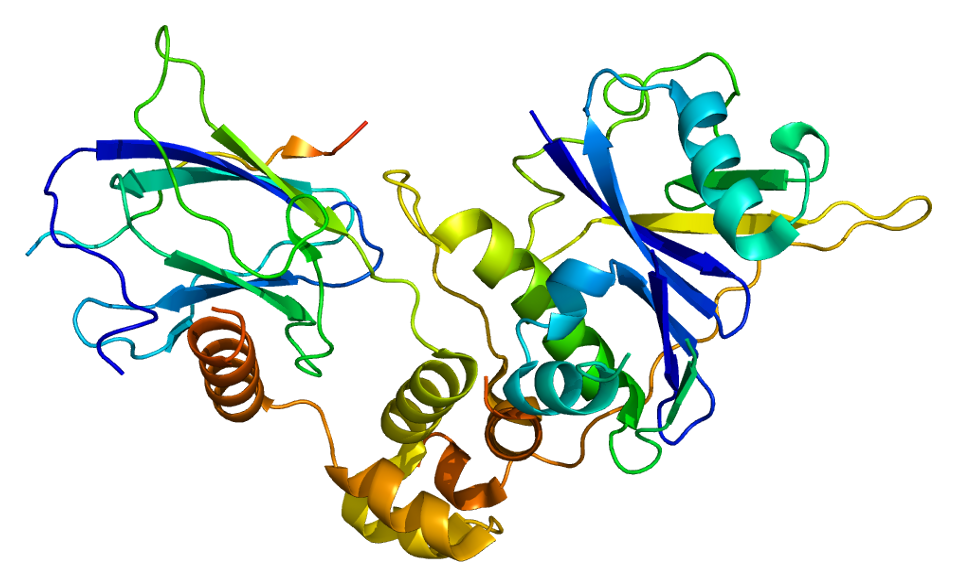
Available structures
PDB	Ortholog search: PDBe RCSB
PDB	List of PDB id codes 4WQO, 1LM8, 1LQB, 1VCB, 3ZRC, 3ZRF, 3ZTC, 3ZTD, 3ZUN, 4AJY, 4AWJ, 4B95, 4B9K, 4BKS, 4BKT, 4W9C, 4W9D, 4W9E, 4W9F, 4W9G, 4W9H, 4W9I, 4W9J, 4W9K, 4W9L

Identifiers
- Aliases: VHL, HRCA1, RCA1, VHL1, pvon Hippel-Lindau tumor suppressor
- External IDs: OMIM: 608537; MGI: 103223; HomoloGene: 465; GeneCards: VHL; OMA:VHL - orthologs

Gene location (Human)
Chr.	Chromosome 3 (human)
Band	3p25.3	Start	10,141,778 bp
Band	3p25.3	End	10,153,667 bp

Gene location (Mouse)
Chr.	Chromosome 6 (mouse)
Band	6 E3|6 52.81 cM	Start	113,600,920 bp
Band	6 E3|6 52.81 cM	End	113,608,594 bp
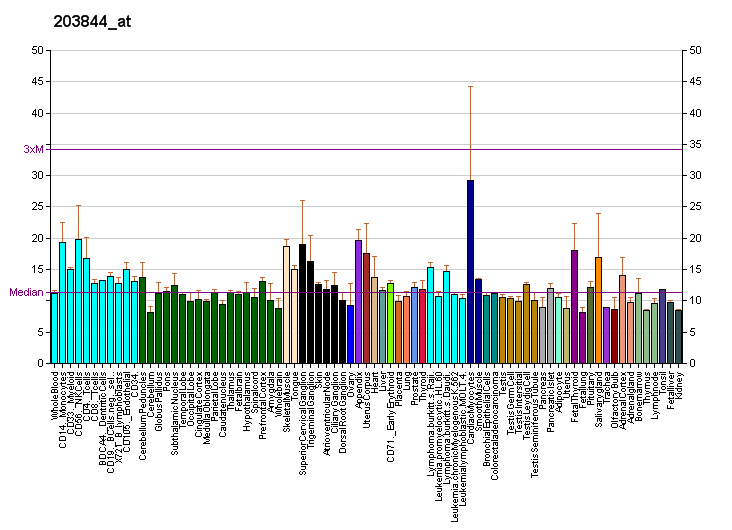
RNA expression pattern
Bgee	Human / Mouse (ortholog); Top expressed in: monocyte; ganglionic eminence; stromal cell of endometrium; ventricular zone; buccal mucosa cell; granulocyte; islet of Langerhans; lymph node; epithelium of colon; rectum / Top expressed in: spermatid; dentate gyrus of hippocampal formation granule cell; medial ganglionic eminence; spermatocyte; cumulus cell; morula; granulocyte; ventricular zone; neural layer of retina; genital tubercle; More reference expression data
BioGPS	More reference expression data
Gene ontology
Molecular function	ubiquitin protein ligase activity; transcription factor binding; ubiquitin-protein transferase activity; protein binding; enzyme binding
Cellular component	cytoplasm; cytosol; VCB complex; membrane; nucleoplasm; endoplasmic reticulum; mitochondrion; nucleus
Biological process	regulation of transcription, DNA-templated; protein stabilization; negative regulation of apoptotic process; negative regulation of transcription by RNA polymerase II; proteolysis; positive regulation of transcription, DNA-templated; positive regulation of cell differentiation; cell morphogenesis; regulation of transcription from RNA polymerase II promoter in response to hypoxia; negative regulation of transcription from RNA polymerase II promoter in response to hypoxia; negative regulation of cell population proliferation; negative regulation of gene expression; protein ubiquitination; post-translational protein modification; negative regulation of receptor signaling pathway via JAK-STAT
Sources:Amigo / QuickGO
Orthologs
Species	Human	Mouse
Entrez	7428	22346
Ensembl	ENSG00000134086	ENSMUSG00000033933
UniProt	P40337	P40338
RefSeq (mRNA)	NM_000551; NM_198156; NM_001354723	NM_009507
RefSeq (protein)	NP_000542; NP_937799; NP_001341652; NP_000542.1	NP_033533
Location (UCSC)	Chr 3: 10.14 – 10.15 Mb	Chr 6: 113.6 – 113.61 Mb
PubMed search
- Wikidata
View/Edit Human	View/Edit Mouse

The Von Hippel–Lindau tumor suppressor also known as pVHL is a protein that, in humans, is encoded by the VHL gene. Mutations of the VHL gene are associated with Von Hippel–Lindau disease, which is characterized by hemangioblastomas of the brain, spinal cord and retina. It is also associated with kidney and pancreatic lesions.

== Function ==
The protein encoded by the VHL gene is the substrate recognition component of a protein complex that includes elongin B, elongin C, and cullin-2, and possesses E3 ubiquitin ligase activity. This complex is involved in the ubiquitination and subsequent degradation of hypoxia-inducible factors (HIFs), which are transcription factors that play a central role regulating gene expression in response to changing oxygen levels. RNA polymerase II subunit POLR2G/RPB7 is also reported to be a target of this protein. Alternatively spliced transcript variants encoding distinct isoforms have been observed.

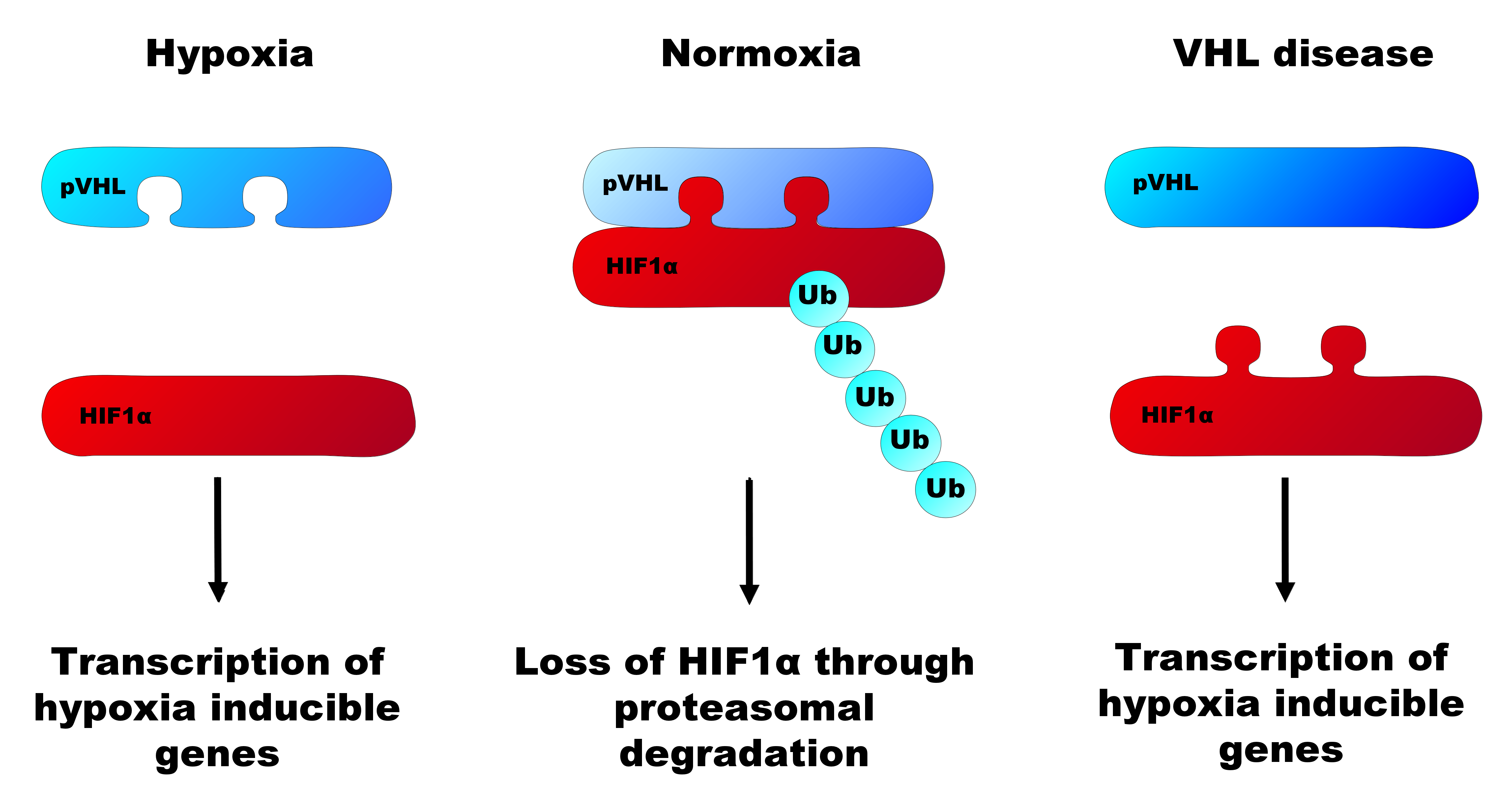
The regulation of HIF1α by pVHL. Under normal oxygen levels, HIF1α binds pVHL through 2 hydroxylated proline residues and is polyubiquitinated by pVHL. This leads to its degradation via the proteasome. During hypoxia, the proline residues are not hydroxylated and pVHL cannot bind. HIF1α causes the transcription of genes that contain the hypoxia response element. In VHL disease, genetic mutations cause alterations to the pVHL protein, usually to the HIF1α binding site.

The resultant protein is produced in two forms, an 18 kDa and a 30 kDa protein that functions as a tumor suppressor. The main action of the VHL protein is thought to be its E3 ubiquitin ligase activity that results in specific target proteins being 'marked' for degradation.

The most researched of these targets is hypoxia inducible factor 1a (HIF1a), a transcription factor that induces the expression of a number of angiogenesis related factors.

HIFs are necessary for tumor growth because most cancers demand high metabolic activity and are only supplied by structurally or functionally inadequate vasculature. Activation of HIFs allow for enhanced angiogenesis, which in turn allow for increased glucose uptake. While HIFs are mostly active in hypoxic conditions, VHL-defective renal carcinoma cells show constitutive activation of HIF even in oxygenated environments.

It is clear that VHL and HIFs interact closely. Firstly, all renal cell carcinoma mutations in VHL that have been tested affect the protein's ability to modify HIF. Additionally, HIF activation can be detected in the earliest events in tumorigenesis in patients with VHL syndrome. In normal cells in hypoxic conditions, HIF1A is activated with little activation of HIF2A. However, in tumors the balance of HIF1A and HIF2A is tipped towards HIF2A. While HIF1A serves as a pro-apoptotic factor, HIF2A interacts with cyclin D1. This leads to increased survival due to lower rates of apoptosis and increased proliferation due to the activation of cyclin D1. Recent genome-wide analysis (GWAS) of HIF binding in kidney cancer showed that HIF1A binds upstream of majorly good prognosis genes, while HIF2A binds upstream to majorly poor prognosis genes. This indicates that the HIF transcription factor distribution in kidney cancer is of major importance in determining the outcome of the patients.

In the normal cell with active VHL protein, HIF alpha is regulated by hydroxylation in the presence of oxygen. When iron, 2-oxoglutarate and oxygen are present, HIF is inactivated by HIF hydroxylases. Hydroxylation of HIF creates a binding site for pVHL (the protein product of the VHL gene). pVHL directs the polyubiquitylation of HIF1A, ensuring that this protein will be degraded by the proteasome. In hypoxic conditions, HIF1A subunits accumulate and bind to HIFB. This heterodimer of HIF is a transcription factor that activates genes that encode for proteins such as vascular endothelial growth factor (VEGF) and erythropoietin, proteins that are both involved in angiogenesis. Cells with abnormal pVHL are unable to disrupt the formation of these dimers, and therefore behave like they are hypoxic even in oxygenated environments.

HIF has also been linked to mTOR, a central controller of growth decisions. It has recently been shown that HIF activation can inactivate mTOR.

HIF can help explain the organ-specific nature of VHL syndrome. It has been theorized that constitutively activating HIF in any cell could lead to cancer, but that there are redundant regulators of HIF in organs not affected by VHL syndrome. This theory has been disproved multiple times since in all cell types loss of VHL function leads to constitutive activation of HIF and its downstream effects. Another theory holds that although in all cells loss of VHL leads to activation of HIF, in most cells this leads to no advantage in proliferation or survival. Additionally, the nature of the mutation in the VHL protein leads to phenotypic manifestations in the pattern of cancer that develops. Nonsense or deletion mutations of VHL protein have been linked to type 1 VHL with a low risk of pheochromocytoma (adrenal gland tumors). Type 2 VHL has been linked to missense mutations and is linked to a high risk of pheochromocytoma. Type 2 has also been further subdivided based on risks of renal cell carcinoma. In types 1, 2A and 2B the mutant pVHL is defective in HIF regulation, while type 2C mutant are defective in protein kinase C regulation. These genotype–phenotype correlations suggest that missense mutations of pVHL lead to a 'gain of function' protein.

The involvement in VHL in renal cell cancer can be rationalized via multiple characteristics of renal cells. First, they are more sensitive to the effects of growth factors created downstream of HIF activation than other cells. Secondly, the link to Cyclin D1 (as mentioned above) is only seen in renal cells. Finally, many cells in the kidney normally operate under hypoxic conditions. This may give them a proliferative advantage over other cells while in hypoxic environments.

In addition to its interaction with HIF the VHL protein can also associate with tubulin. It is then capable to stabilize and thus elongate microtubules. This function plays a key role in the stabilisation of the spindle during mitosis. Deletion or downregulation of VHL causes a drastic increase of misorientated and rotating spindles during mitosis. Through a not-yet-known mechanism, VHL also increases the concentration of MAD2, an important protein of the spindle checkpoint. Also, VHL colocalizes with the microtubule. Thus VHL loss leads to a weakened checkpoint and subsequently chromosome missegregation and aneuploidy.

== Pathology ==
Von Hippel–Lindau syndrome (VHL) is a dominantly inherited hereditary cancer syndrome predisposing to a variety of malignant and benign tumors of the eye, brain, spinal cord, kidney, pancreas, and adrenal glands. A germline mutation of this gene is the basis of familial inheritance of VHL syndrome. Individuals with VHL syndrome inherit one mutation in the VHL protein that causes the protein's normal function to be lost or altered. Over time, sporadic mutation in the second copy of the VHL protein can lead to carcinomas, in particular hemangioblastomas affecting the liver and kidneys, renal (and vaginal) clear cell adenocarcinomas.

The loss of VHL protein activity results in an increased amount of HIF1a, and thus increased levels of angiogenic factors, including VEGF and PDGF. In turn, this leads to unregulated blood vessel growth, one of the prerequisites of a tumor. Additionally, VHL has been implicated in maintaining the differentiated phenotype in renal cells. Furthermore, cell culture experiments with VHL -/- cells have shown that the addition of pVHL can induce a mesenchymal to epithelial transition. This evidence suggests that VHL has a central role in maintaining a differentiated phenotype in the cell.

Additionally, pVHL is important for extracellular matrix formation. This protein may also be important in inhibition of matrix metalloproteinases. These ideas are extremely important in the metastasis of VHL-deficient cells. In classical VHL disease a single wild-type allele in VHL appears to be sufficient to maintain normal cardiopulmonary function.

Diseases associated with mutation in the VHL gene such as subtype 1, 2A, and 2B has shown an upregulation of HIF. Which is some worth expected. However, there is normal expression of HIF in subtype 2C VHL disease which has a clinical phenotype as Phaeochromocytoma. There are different mutations such as BRAF, TP53, PTEN, RB1, epidermal growth factor receptor (EGFR) and ERBB2 observed in clear-cell renal cell carcinoma (ccRCC).However, more than 97% of those with ccRcc have a VHL mutation.

== Treatment ==
Suggested targets for VHL-related cancers include targets of the HIF pathway, such as VEGF. Inhibitors of VEGF receptor sorafenib, sunitinib, pazopanib, and recently axitinib have been approved by the FDA. The mTOR inhibitor rapamycin analogs everolimus and temsirolimus or VEGF monoclonal antibody bevacizumab may also be an option.

Since iron, 2-oxoglutarate and oxygen are necessary for the inactivation of HIF, it has been theorized that a lack of these cofactors could reduce the ability of hydroxylases in inactivating HIF. A recent study has shown that in cells with a high activation of HIF even in oxygenated environments was reversed by supplying the cells with ascorbate. Thus, Vitamin C may be a potential treatment for HIF induced tumors.

== Applications ==
VHL has been frequently utilized for its E3 ubiquitin ligase activity in targeted protein degradation applications such as with PROTACs. Derivatized VHL ligands that act as molecular glue degraders have also been discovered through high-throughput screening.

== Interactions ==
Von Hippel–Lindau tumor suppressor has been shown to interact with:

- CCDC82,
- CUL2,
- Filamin,
- HIF1AN,
- HIF1A,
- Nerve Growth factor IB,
- PHF17,
- PSMC3,
- SAP130,
- TCEB1,
- TCEB2, and
- USP33.

== See also ==
- Von Hippel–Lindau binding protein 1 – Chaperone protein
