= Von Hippel–Lindau disease =

Genetic disorder

- Other names: Familial cerebello retinal angiomatosis
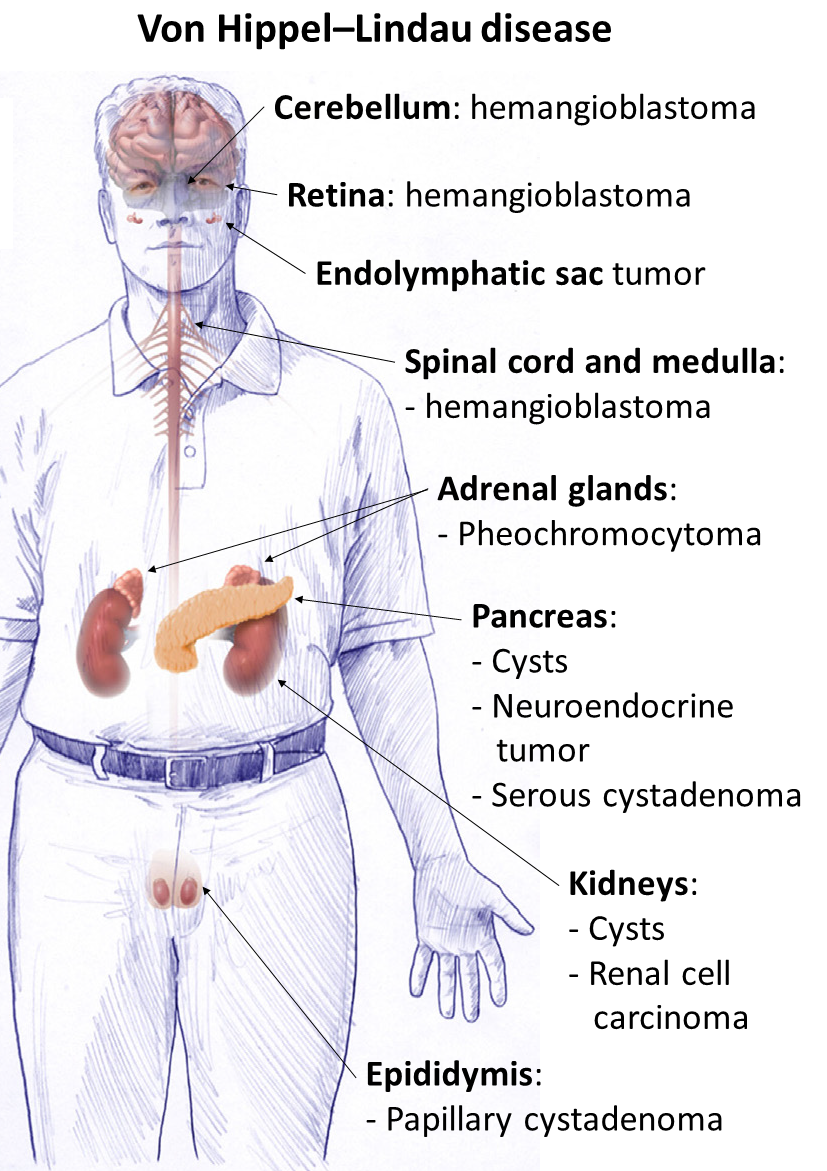
- Locations of the main types of cysts and tumors in Von Hippel–Lindau disease.
- Specialty: Medical genetics, neurology
- Frequency: 0.0021322%

Von Hippel–Lindau disease (VHL), also known as Von Hippel–Lindau syndrome, is a rare genetic disorder with multisystem involvement. It is characterized by polycystic disease and benign tumors with potential for subsequent malignant transformation. It is a type of phakomatosis that results from a mutation in the Von Hippel–Lindau tumor suppressor gene on chromosome 3p25.3.

== Signs and symptoms ==
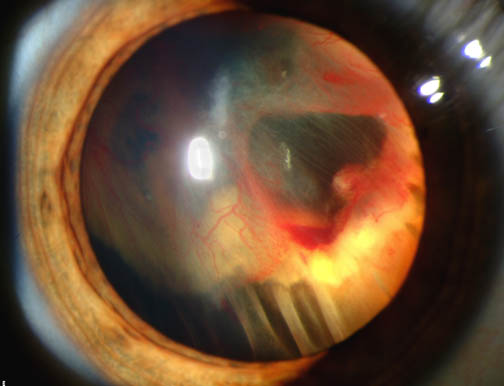
Slit lamp photograph showing retinal detachment in Von Hippel–Lindau disease

Tumor/cyst type	Prevalence
Pancreatic cysts	50-91%
Cerebellar hemangioblastoma	44-72%
Renal cysts	59-63%
Retinal hemangioblastoma	45-59%
Renal cell carcinoma	24-45%
Spinal cord hemangioblastoma	13-59%
Papillary cystadenoma of the epididymis	10-60% of males
Pheochromocytoma	0-60%
Neuroendocrine tumor of the pancreas	5-17%
Serous cystadenoma of the pancreas	12%
Medullary hemangioblastoma	5%

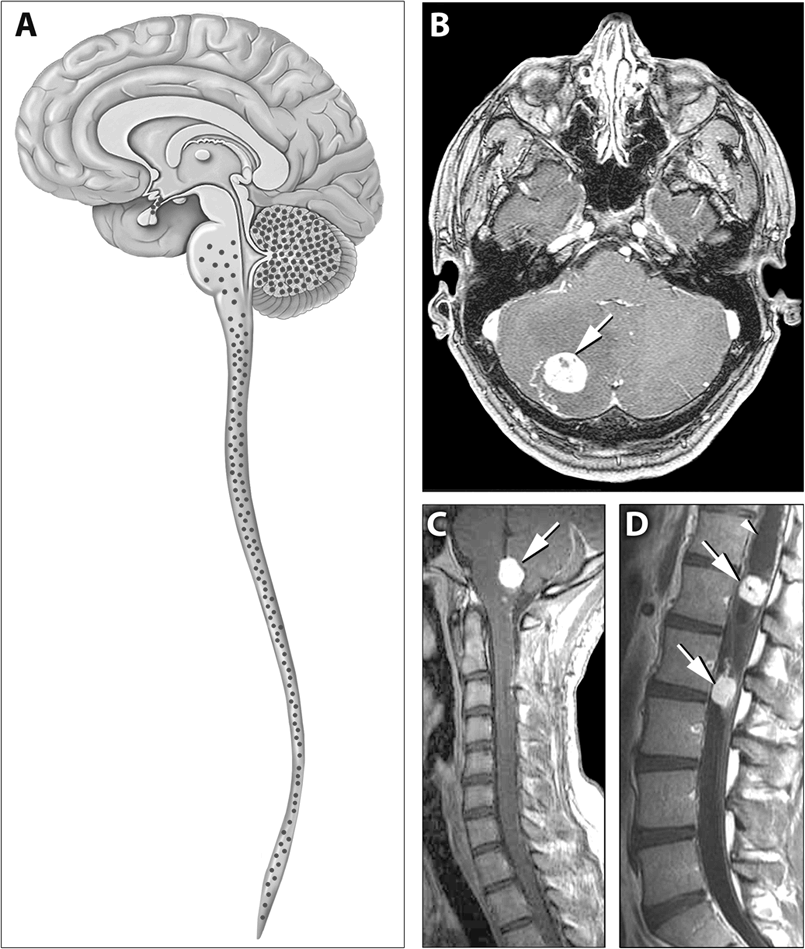
Typical distribution of hemangioblastomas in Von Hippel–Lindau disease.

Signs and symptoms associated with VHL disease include headaches, problems with balance and walking, dizziness, weakness of the limbs, vision problems, and high blood pressure.

Six organ systems mainly are affected: the central nervous system; retina; pancreas; kidney; adrenal gland; epididymis.

Conditions associated with VHL disease include angiomatosis, hemangioblastomas, pheochromocytoma, renal cell carcinoma, pancreatic cysts (pancreatic serous cystadenoma), endolymphatic sac tumor, and bilateral papillary cystadenomas of the epididymis (men) or broad ligament of the uterus (women). Angiomatosis occurs in 37.2% of patients presenting with VHL disease and usually occurs in the retina. As a result, loss of vision is very common. However, other organs can be affected: strokes, heart attacks, and cardiovascular disease are common additional symptoms. Approximately 40% of VHL disease presents with CNS hemangioblastomas and they are present in around 60–80%. Spinal hemangioblastomas are found in 13–59% of VHL disease and are specific because 80% are found in VHL disease. Although all of these tumors are common in VHL disease, around half of cases present with only one tumor type. Most people with VHL develop symptoms in their mid-twenties.

== Pathogenesis ==
The disease is caused by mutations of the Von Hippel–Lindau tumor suppressor (VHL) gene on the short arm of chromosome 3 (3p25-26). There are over 1500 germline mutations and somatic mutations found in VHL disease.

Von Hippel–Lindau disease is inherited in an autosomal dominant pattern.

Every cell in the body has two copies of every gene (bar those found in the sex chromosomes, X and Y). In VHL disease, one copy of the VHL gene has a mutation and produces a faulty VHL protein (pVHL). However, the second copy still produces a functional protein. The condition is inherited in an autosomal dominant manner – one copy of the faulty gene is sufficient to increase the risk of developing tumours.

Approximately 20% of cases of VHL disease are found in individuals without a family history, known as de novo mutations. An inherited mutation of the VHL gene is responsible for the remaining 80 percent of cases.

Of mutations in the VHL gene, 30–40% consist of 50-250kb deletion mutations that remove either part of the gene or the whole gene and flanking regions of DNA. The remaining 60–70% of VHL disease is caused by the truncation of pVHL by nonsense mutations, indel mutations or splice site mutations.

=== VHL protein ===
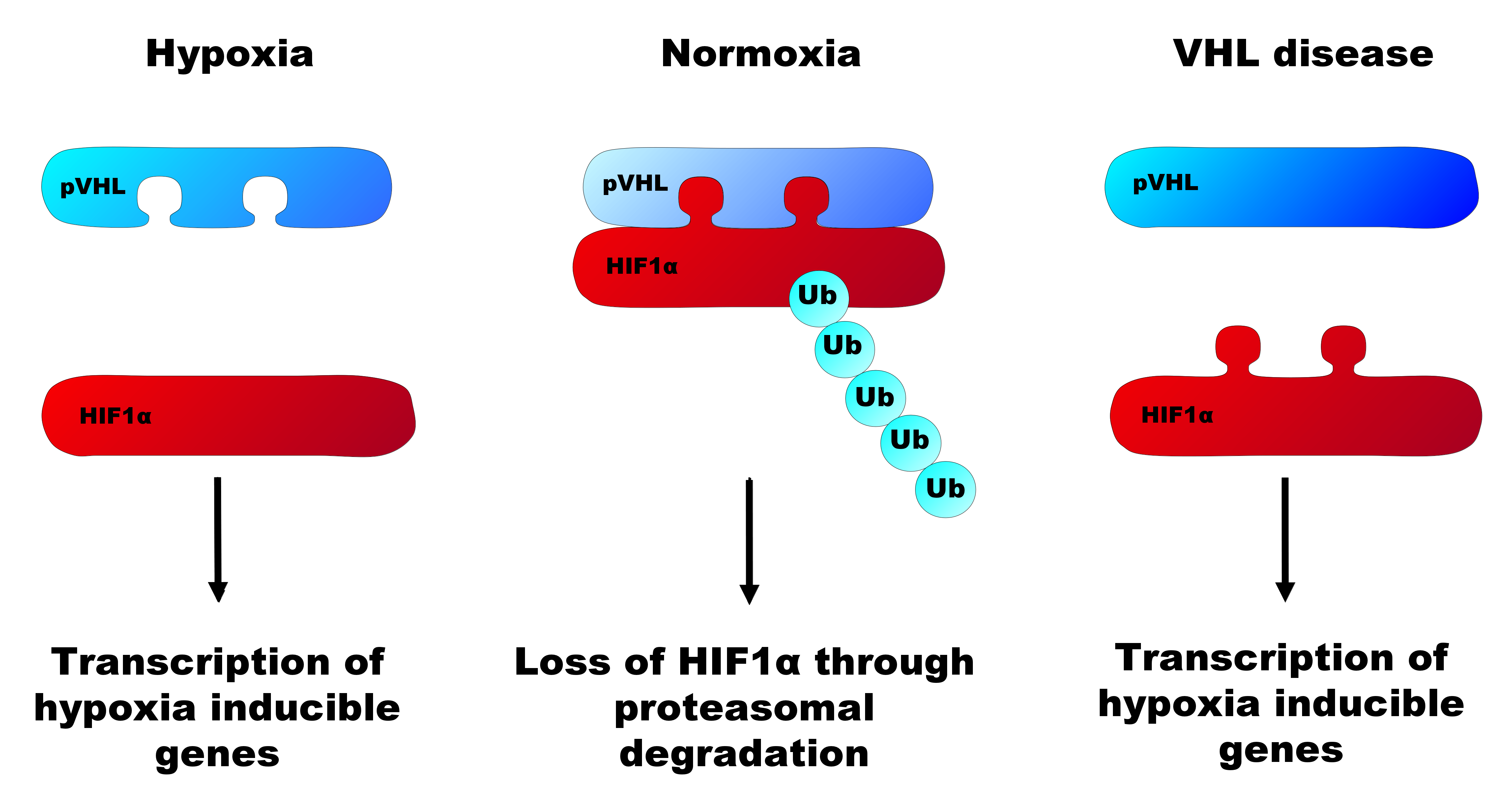
The regulation of HIF1α by pVHL. Under normal oxygen levels, HIF1α binds pVHL through two hydroxylated proline residues and is polyubiquitinated by pVHL. This leads to its degradation via the proteasome. During hypoxia, the proline residues are not hydroxylated and pVHL cannot bind. HIF1α causes the transcription of genes that contain the hypoxia response element. In VHL disease, genetic mutations cause alterations to the pVHL protein, usually to the HIF1α binding site.

The VHL protein (pVHL) is involved in the regulation of a protein known as hypoxia inducible factor 1α (HIF1α). This is a subunit of a heterodimeric transcription factor that at normal cellular oxygen levels is highly regulated. In normal physiological conditions, pVHL recognizes and binds to HIF1α only when oxygen is present due to the post translational hydroxylation of two proline residues within the HIF1α protein. pVHL is an E3 ligase that ubiquitinates HIF1α and causes its degradation by the proteasome. In low oxygen conditions or in cases of VHL disease where the VHL gene is mutated, pVHL does not bind to HIF1α. This allows the subunit to dimerise with HIF1β and activate the transcription of a number of genes, including vascular endothelial growth factor, platelet-derived growth factor B, erythropoietin and genes involved in glucose uptake and metabolism.

== Diagnosis ==
The detection of tumours specific to VHL disease is important in the disease's diagnosis. In individuals with a family history of VHL disease, one hemangioblastoma, pheochromocytoma or renal cell carcinoma may be sufficient to make a diagnosis. As all the tumours associated with VHL disease can be found sporadically, at least two tumours must be identified to diagnose VHL disease in a person without a family history.

Genetic diagnosis is also useful in VHL disease diagnosis. In hereditary VHL disease, techniques such as the Southern blot and gene sequencing can be used to analyse DNA and identify mutations. These tests can be used to screen family members of those afflicted with VHL disease; de novo cases that produce genetic mosaicism are more difficult to detect because mutations are not found in the white blood cells that are used for genetic analysis.

=== Classification ===
Von Hippel-Lindau (VHL) disease is classified into two main types based on the presence or absence of pheochromocytoma (pheo). VHL type 1 is characterized by the absence of pheo, while VHL type 2 encompasses individuals with pheo and is further divided into three subcategories: type 2A, type 2B, and type 2C. Diagnosis of VHL is guided by two key criteria. The first involves patients with a family history of developing hemangioblastomas (HB) in the central nervous system (CNS) or retinal angiomas (RA), pheo, pancreatic tumors or cysts, or epididymal cystadenomas. The second criterion applies to patients without a family history of VHL disease who present with hemangioblastomas or retinal angiomas in conjunction with other tumors such as renal cell carcinoma (RCC), pheo, pancreatic tumors or cysts, or epididymal cystadenomas.

==== Classification terms ====
Pheo - A pheochromocytoma is an adrenal tumor that makes and releases excess catecholamines. These tumors can cause serious health problems including stroke, heart attack, and even death.

Hemangioblastomas - a hemangioblastoma is a tumor that grows in the blood vessels of your brain, spinal cord or retina. It isn't cancerous, but it may grow and press on surrounding tissues. Usually, healthcare providers recommend removing a hemangioblastoma with surgery. After removal, a hemangioblastoma is unlikely to grow back.

Retina angiomas - retinal capillary hemangiomas also known as retinal hemangioblastomas, occur most frequently in conjunction with von Hippel-Lindau (VHL) syndrome. These lesions are characterized by plump, but otherwise normal, retinal capillary endothelial cells with normal pericytes and basement membrane.

Epidydimal cystadenomas- A cyst that grows on the male testes.

Renal cell carcinoma- The most common type of kidney cancer.

== Treatment ==
Early recognition and treatment of specific manifestations of VHL can substantially decrease complications and improve quality of life. For this reason, individuals with VHL disease are usually screened routinely for retinal angiomas, CNS hemangioblastomas, clear-cell renal carcinomas and pheochromocytomas. CNS hemangioblastomas are usually surgically removed if they are symptomatic. Photocoagulation and cryotherapy are usually used for the treatment of symptomatic retinal angiomas, although anti-angiogenic treatments may also be an option. Renal tumours may be removed by a partial nephrectomy or other techniques, such as radiofrequency ablation.

Belzutifan is a drug approved for the treatment of von Hippel–Lindau disease-associated renal cell carcinoma and sold by Merck under the name Welireg.

== Epidemiology ==
VHL disease has an incidence of one in 36,000 births. There is over 90% penetrance by the age of 65. Age at diagnosis varies from infancy to age 60–70 years, with an average patient age at clinical diagnosis of 26 years.

== History ==
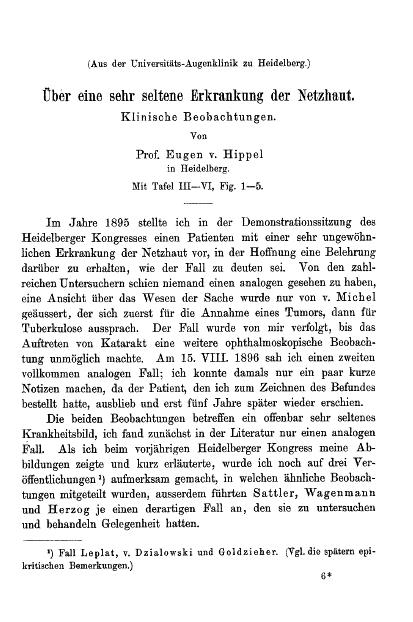
Original Von Hippel's description of disease

The German ophthalmologist Eugen von Hippel first described angiomas in the eye in 1904. Arvid Lindau described the angiomas of the cerebellum and spine in 1927. The term Von Hippel–Lindau disease was first used in 1936; however, its use became common only in the 1970s.

== Notable cases ==
Some descendants of the McCoy family (involved in the Hatfield–McCoy feud along West Virginia–Kentucky border in the US) are presumed to have VHL. In an article appearing in the Associated Press, it has been speculated by a Vanderbilt University endocrinologist that the hostility underlying the Hatfield–McCoy feud may have been partly due to the consequences of Von Hippel–Lindau disease. The article suggests that the McCoy family was predisposed to bad tempers because many of them had a pheochromocytoma that produced excess adrenaline and a tendency toward explosive tempers. An update of the Associated Press article in 2023 carries more details.

== Nomenclature ==
Other uncommon names are: angiomatosis retinae, familial cerebello-retinal angiomatosis, cerebelloretinal hemangioblastomatosis, Hippel Disease, Hippel–Lindau syndrome, HLS, VHL, Lindau disease and retinocerebellar angiomatosis.

== See also ==
- Haemangioblastoma
- Epithelial sodium channel
- Nephron
- Proximal convoluted tubule
