= Eye color =

Polygenic phenotypic characteristic

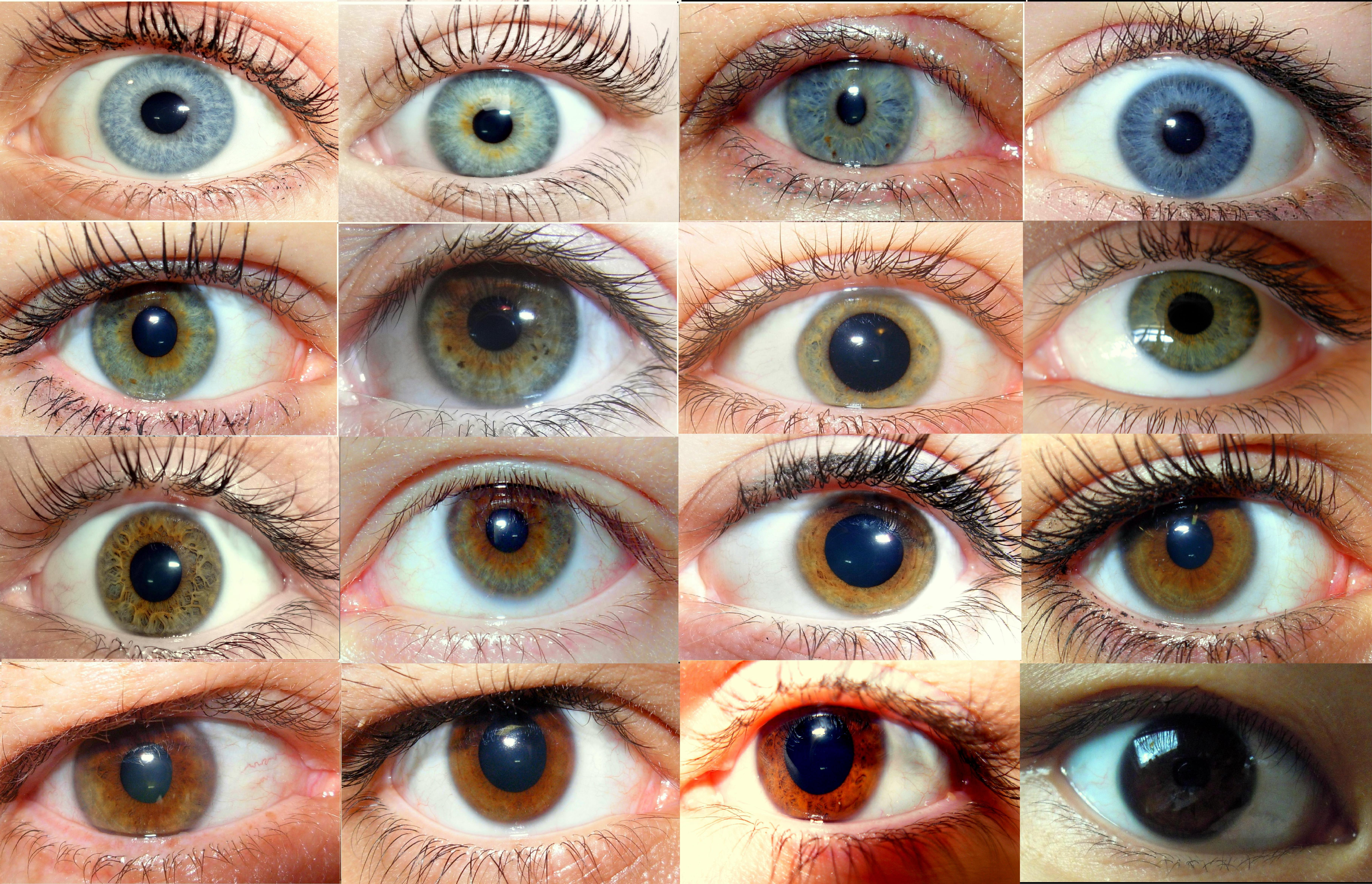
The irises of human eyes exhibit a wide spectrum of colours

Eye color is a polygenic phenotypic trait determined by two factors: the pigmentation of the eye's iris and the frequency-dependence of the scattering of light by the turbid medium in the stroma of the iris.

In humans, the pigmentation of the iris varies from light brown to black, depending on the concentration of melanin in the iris pigment epithelium (located on the back of the iris), the melanin content within the iris stroma (located at the front of the iris), and the cellular density of the stroma. The appearance of blue, green, and hazel eyes results from the Tyndall scattering of light in the stroma, a phenomenon similar to Rayleigh scattering which accounts for the blue sky. Neither blue nor green pigments are present in the human iris or vitreous humour. This is an example of structural color, which depends on the lighting conditions, especially for lighter-colored eyes.

The brightly colored eyes of many bird species result from the presence of other pigments, such as pteridines, purines, and carotenoids. Humans and other animals have many phenotypic variations in eye color. Mammals are born with blue eyes and all variations in darkening develop after birth.

The genetics and inheritance of eye color in humans is complicated. As of 2010, as many as 16 genes have been associated with human eye color inheritance. Some of the eye-color genes include OCA2 and HERC2.

== Genetic determination ==
Eye color is an inherited trait determined by multiple genes. These genes are sought by studying small changes in the genes themselves and in neighboring genes, called single-nucleotide polymorphisms or SNPs. The total number of genes that contribute to eye color is unknown, but there are some likely candidates. A study in Rotterdam (2009) found that it was possible to predict eye color with more than 90% accuracy for brown and blue using just six SNPs.

People of European descent show the greatest variety in eye color of any population worldwide. Recent advances in ancient DNA technology have revealed some of the history of eye color in Europe. Through the analysis of ancient DNA, a 2020 study published in Experimental Dermatology suggested that the common gene for blue eye color likely originated in the Near East and arrived in Europe around 42,000 years ago, after the exodus out of Africa.

There is evidence that as many as 16 different genes could be responsible for eye color in humans; however, the main two genes associated with eye color variation are OCA2 and HERC2, and both are localized in chromosome 15.

The gene OCA2 (OMIM: 203200), when in a variant form, causes the pink eye color and hypopigmentation common in human albinism. (The name of the gene is derived from the disorder it causes, oculocutaneous albinism type II.) Different SNPs within OCA2 are strongly associated with blue and green eyes as well as variations in freckling, mole counts, hair and skin tone. The polymorphisms may be in an OCA2 regulatory sequence, where they may influence the expression of the gene product, which in turn affects pigmentation. A specific mutation within the HERC2 gene, a gene that regulates OCA2 expression, is partly responsible for blue eyes. Other genes implicated in eye color variation are SLC24A4 and TYR. A 2010 study of eye color variation in hue and saturation values using high-resolution digital full-eye photographs found three new loci for a total of ten genes, allowing the explanation of about 50% of eye color variation.

Gene name	Effect on eye color
OCA2	Associated with melanin producing cells. Central importance to eye color.
HERC2	Affects function of OCA2, with a specific mutation strongly linked to blue eyes.
SLC24A4	Associated with differences between blue and green eyes.
TYR	Associated with differences between blue and green eyes.

Blue eyes with a brown spot, green eyes, and gray eyes are caused by an entirely different part of the genome.

== Changes in eye color ==
A 1997 study of White Americans found that eye color may be subject to change in infancy, and from adolescence to adulthood. Seventeen percent of children experienced a change of eye color by adulthood. Of those children, 50% developed lighter eyes as they got older. The other 50% developed darker eyes.

Generally, children with hazel and light brown eyes tended to experience a lightening of their eye color by adulthood. Children with green eyes often experienced a darkening of their eye color. It was also found that 11% of the children's mothers experienced an eye color change during the same period, with most developing lighter eyes, relative to their original color at the time of their child's birth.

== Eye color range ==

As is the case with hair color and skin color, the melanin that is usually produced in the bodies of almost all mammals is either eumelanin or pheomelanin, resulting in a high proportion of black, brown, red, and yellow coloring in the biological features that make use of it. As such, most mammals generally have a predominantly orange-based color palette, which generally varies from light orange colors like peach to dark orange colors like brown; sometimes even more varied colors like maroon are exhibited.

=== Brown ===
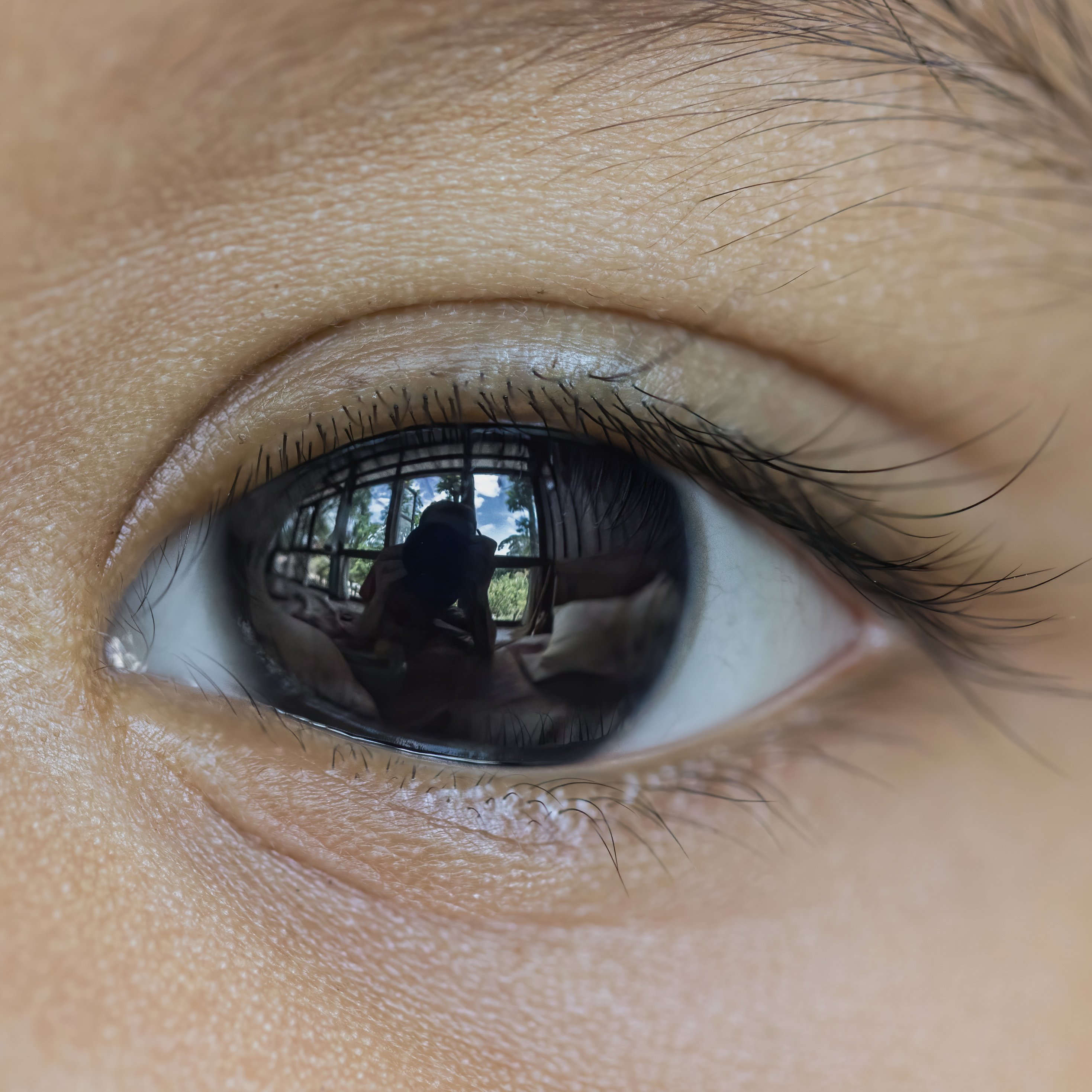
A dark brown iris bordering on black

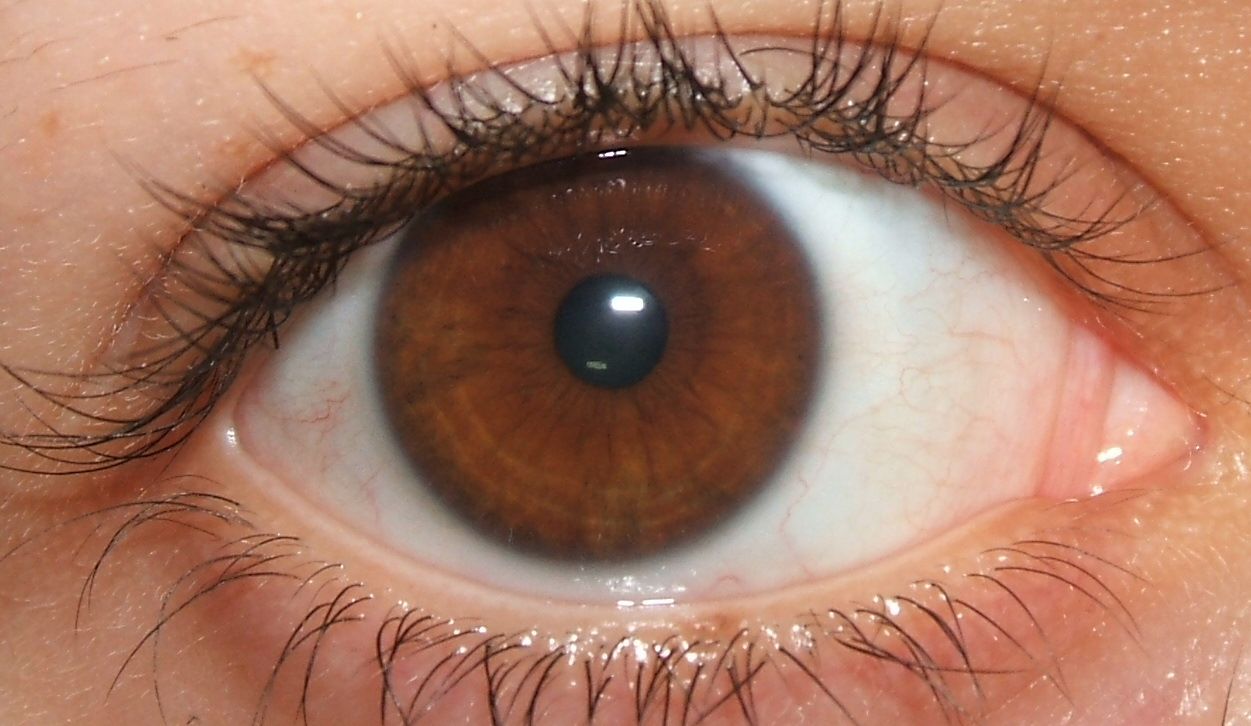
A light brown iris

Almost all mammals have brown or darkly-pigmented irises. In humans, brown is by far the most common eye color, with approximately 79% of people in the world having it. Brown eyes result from a relatively high concentration of melanin in the stroma of the iris, which causes light of both shorter and longer wavelengths to be absorbed.

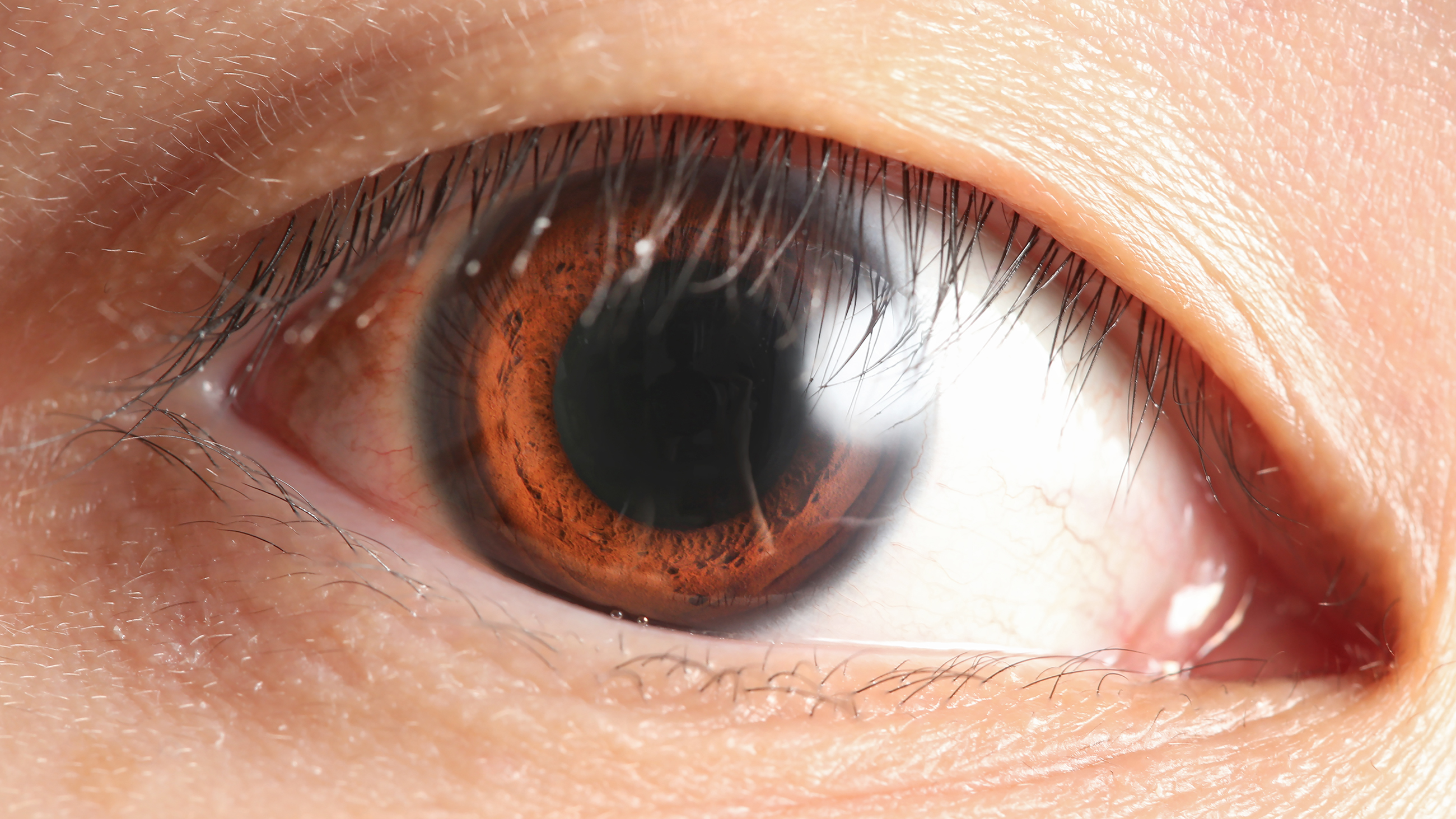
A light brown iris with limbal ring

In many parts of the world, it is nearly the only iris color present. Brown eyes are common in Europe, East Asia, Southeast Asia, Central Asia, South Asia, West Asia, Oceania, West Africa and the Americas. Dark-pigmented brown eyes, bordering on black, are the most common variant of brown eyes due to it being found in various parts of the world such as the Americas, Africa, West Asia, South Asia, East Asia, Southeast Asia, Central Asia, Oceania, and Europe. Light or medium-pigmented brown eyes, often bordering on hazel, can also be commonly found in Europe and in the Americas, particularly amongst European descendants, and in smaller numbers in parts of Central Asia, West Asia, South Asia, and East Africa.

=== Hazel ===
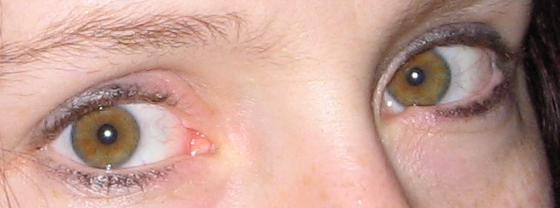
Golden, or amber colored hazel eyes. The iris is the color of a hazelnut shell. This is what hazel eyes traditionally refer to.

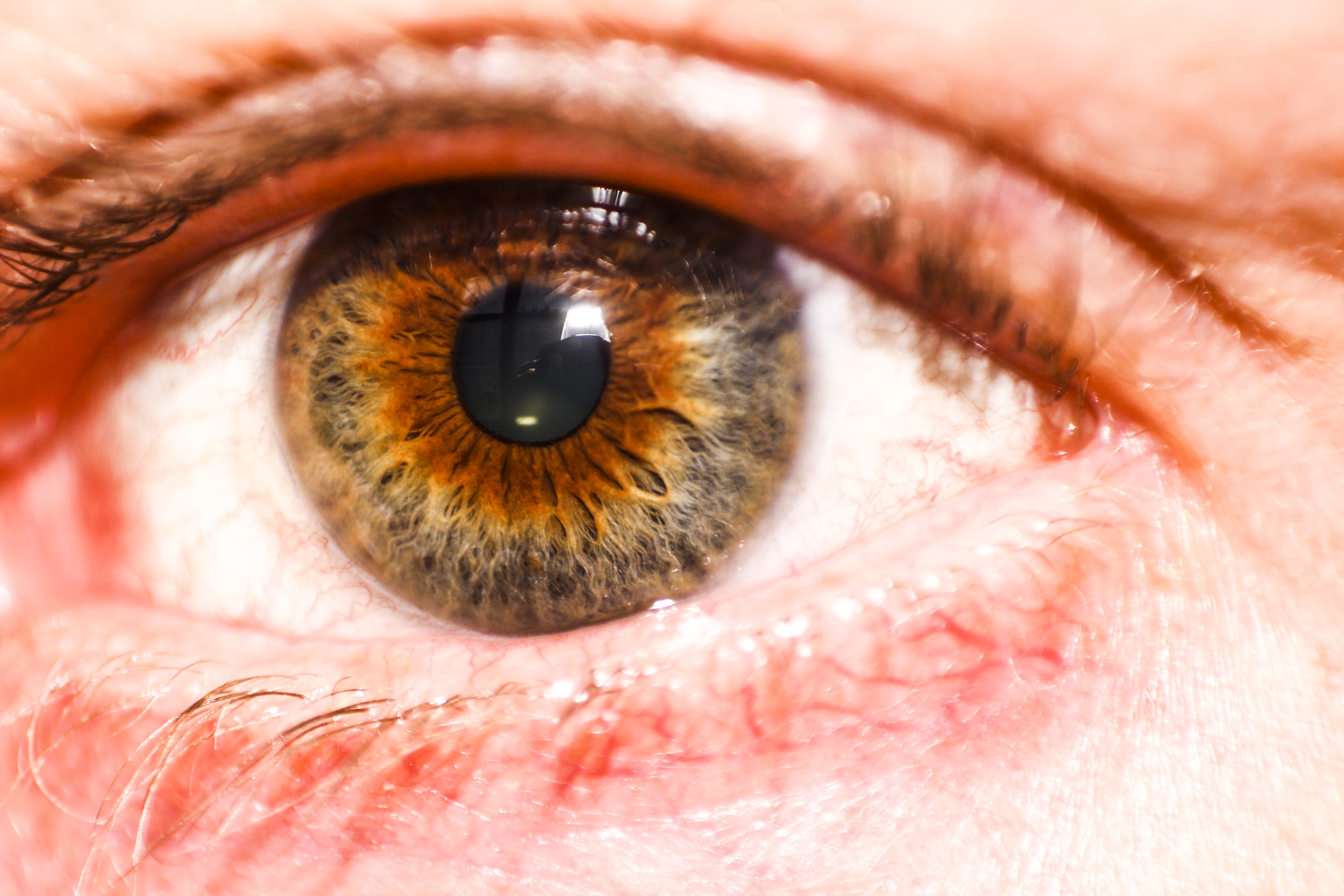
A mixed brown-green eye. In modern usage, hazel eyes can refer to a mixed brown-green eye color.

Definitions of the eye color "hazel" vary: it is traditionally considered to be synonymous with light brown or gold, as in the color of a hazelnut shell, thus making it synonymous with amber. They typically have a strong yellowish/golden or russet/coppery tint, primarily noticeable under sunlight, which is due to a yellow pigment called lipochrome (also found in green eyes). They may also contain amounts of very light goldish gray.

In looser modern definitions, it can also be considered a mixed eye color of brown and green, although in anthropology this was typically referred to as a mixed eye color, rather than hazel. The mixed brown-green combination can sometimes produce a multicolored iris, i.e. an eye that is light brown/amber near the pupil and charcoal or dark green on the outer part of the iris (or vice versa) when observed in sunlight, often appearing to shift from brown to green.

The eyes of some pigeons contain yellow fluorescing pigments known as pteridines. The bright yellow eyes of the great horned owl are thought to be due to the presence of the pteridine pigment xanthopterin within certain chromatophores (called xanthophores) located in the iris stroma. In humans, yellowish specks or patches are thought to be due to the pigment lipofuscin, also known as lipochrome. Many animals such as canines, domestic cats, owls, eagles, pigeons, and fish have golden hazel, or amber, eyes.

Around 10.3% of the US population and 5% of the world population have hazel eyes. Hazel eyes are found primarily in northern and central Europe, most commonly in the United Kingdom, and the traditionally Low Saxon speaking populations of the Netherlands, and Germany Additionally, in mythology, Apollonius Rhodius described the sun god Helios, and his descendants, as having golden eyes.

=== Green ===
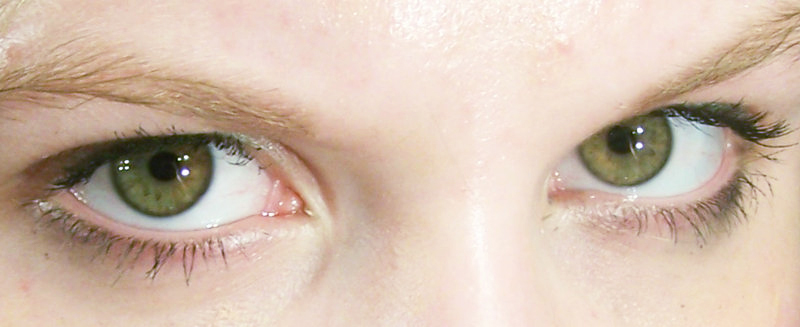
Mixed Brown-Green, or Hazel-Green, eyes

Green eyes probably result from the interaction of multiple allelic variants of OCA2 and other genes. They may have been present in southern Siberia during the Bronze Age.

Green is the rarest human eye color, seen in about 2% of all people worldwide. Around 8–10% of men and 18–21% of women in Iceland and 6% of men and 17% of women in the Netherlands have green eyes.

The green color is caused by the combination of: 1) An iris containing the yellowish pigment lipochrome and 2) a blue shade created by the Rayleigh scattering of reflected light.

=== Blue ===
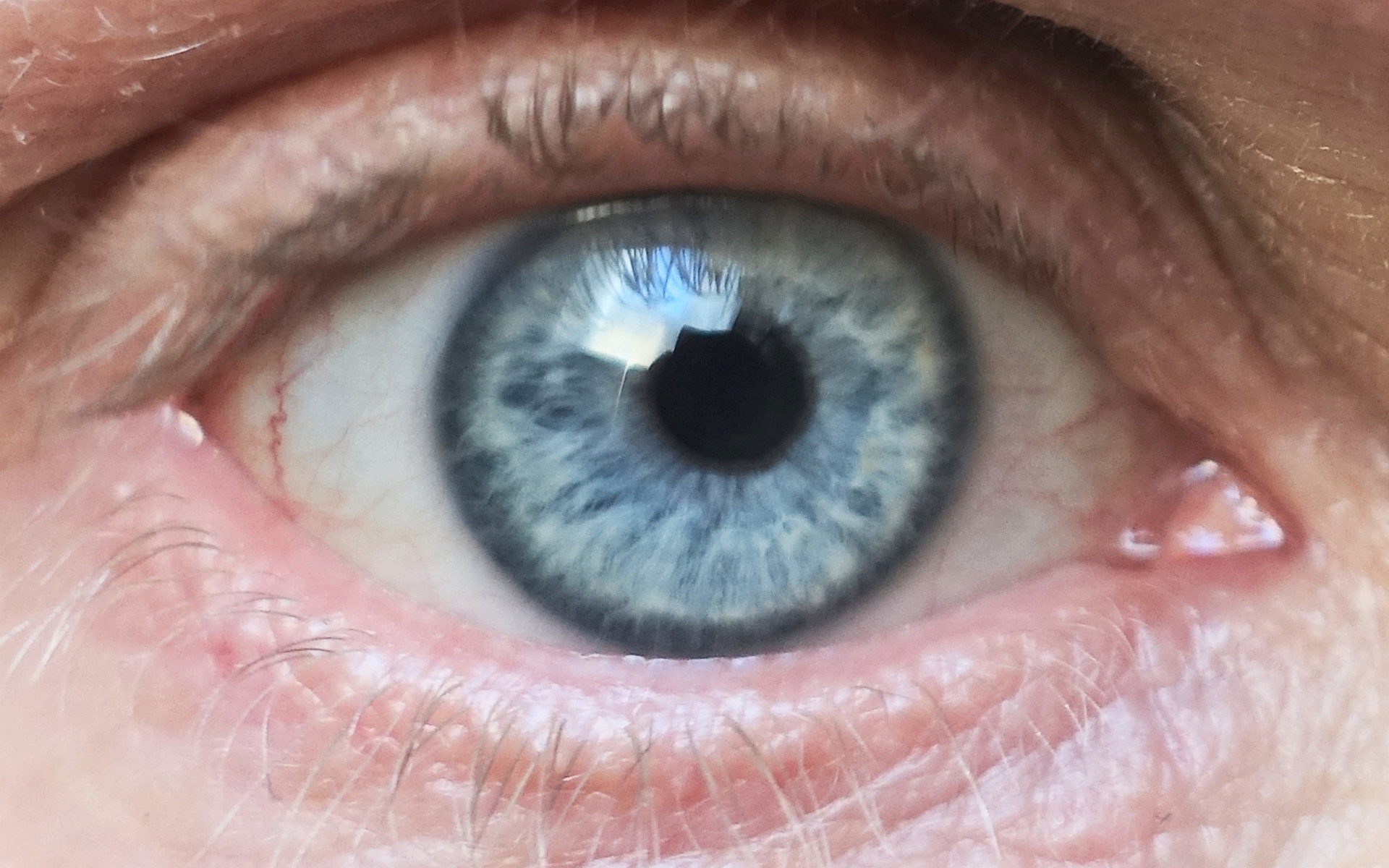
A light blue iris with limbal ring

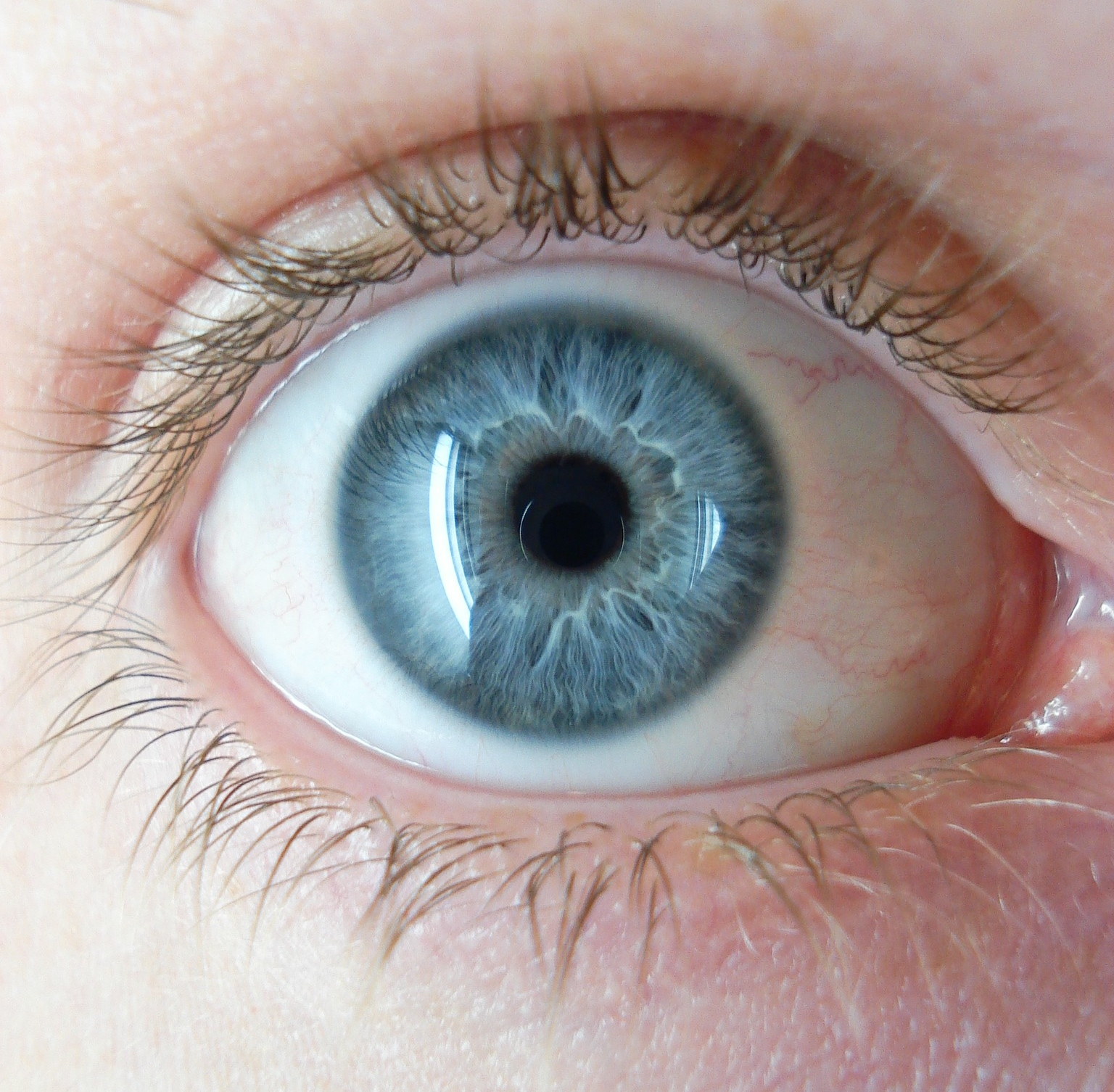
Blue eyes

There is no intrinsically blue pigmentation either in the iris or in the vitreous body; in fact, a form of melanin that would produce a blue coloration does not currently exist in the bodies of most mammals. Rather, blue eyes result from structural color in combination with certain concentrations of non-blue pigments. The iris pigment epithelium is brownish black due to the presence of melanin. Unlike brown eyes, blue eyes have low concentrations of melanin in the stroma of the iris, which lies in front of the dark epithelium. Longer wavelengths of light tend to be absorbed by the dark underlying epithelium, while shorter wavelengths are reflected and undergo Rayleigh scattering in the turbid medium of the stroma. This is the same scattering that accounts for the blue appearance of the sky. The result is a "Tyndall blue" structural color that varies with external lighting conditions.

In 2008, a team of researchers from the University of Copenhagen located a single mutation that causes the phenomenon of blue eyes. The research was published in the Journal of Human Genetics. The same DNA sequence of the OCA2 gene among blue-eyed people suggests they may have a single common ancestor. The researchers hypothesized that the OCA2 mutation responsible for blue eyes arose in an individual who lived in the northwestern part of the Black Sea region in Europe sometime between 6,000 and 10,000 years ago, during the Neolithic period. However, more recent ancient DNA research has identified human remains much older than the Neolithic period which possess the OCA2 mutation for blue eyes. It is now believed that the OCA2 allele responsible for blue eyes dates back to the migration of modern humans out of Africa roughly 50,000 years ago, and entered Europe from western Asia.

Eiberg and colleagues suggested in a study published in Human Genetics that a mutation in the 86th intron of the HERC2 gene, which is hypothesized to interact with the OCA2 gene promoter, reduced expression of OCA2 with subsequent reduction in melanin production.

It has been proposed that blue eyes may have been adaptive to shorter day lengths at higher latitudes, as blue eyes increase intraocular light scattering, which suppresses melatonin release from the pineal gland, perhaps reducing psychological depression (which is linked to the short day length of higher latitudes).

Blue eyes are predominant in northern and eastern Europe, particularly around the Baltic Sea. Blue eyes are also found in Southern Europe, Central Asia, South Asia, North Africa, and West Asia. Approximately 8% to 10% of the global population have blue eyes. A 2002 study found the prevalence of blue eye color among the white population in the United States to be 33.8% for those born from 1936 through 1951, compared with 57.4% for those born from 1899 through 1905. As of 2006, one out of every six Americans, or 16.6% of the total US population, has blue eyes, including 22.3% of whites. The incidence of blue eyes continues to decline among American children. In southern Europe, 56% of Slovenes, 40.8% of Italians from Verona, 22.5% of Spaniards from Alicante and 15.4% of Greeks from Thessaloniki have green, gray or blue eyes. In a series of 221 photographs of Spanish subjects, 16.3% of the subjects were determined to have blue-gray eyes.

=== Gray ===
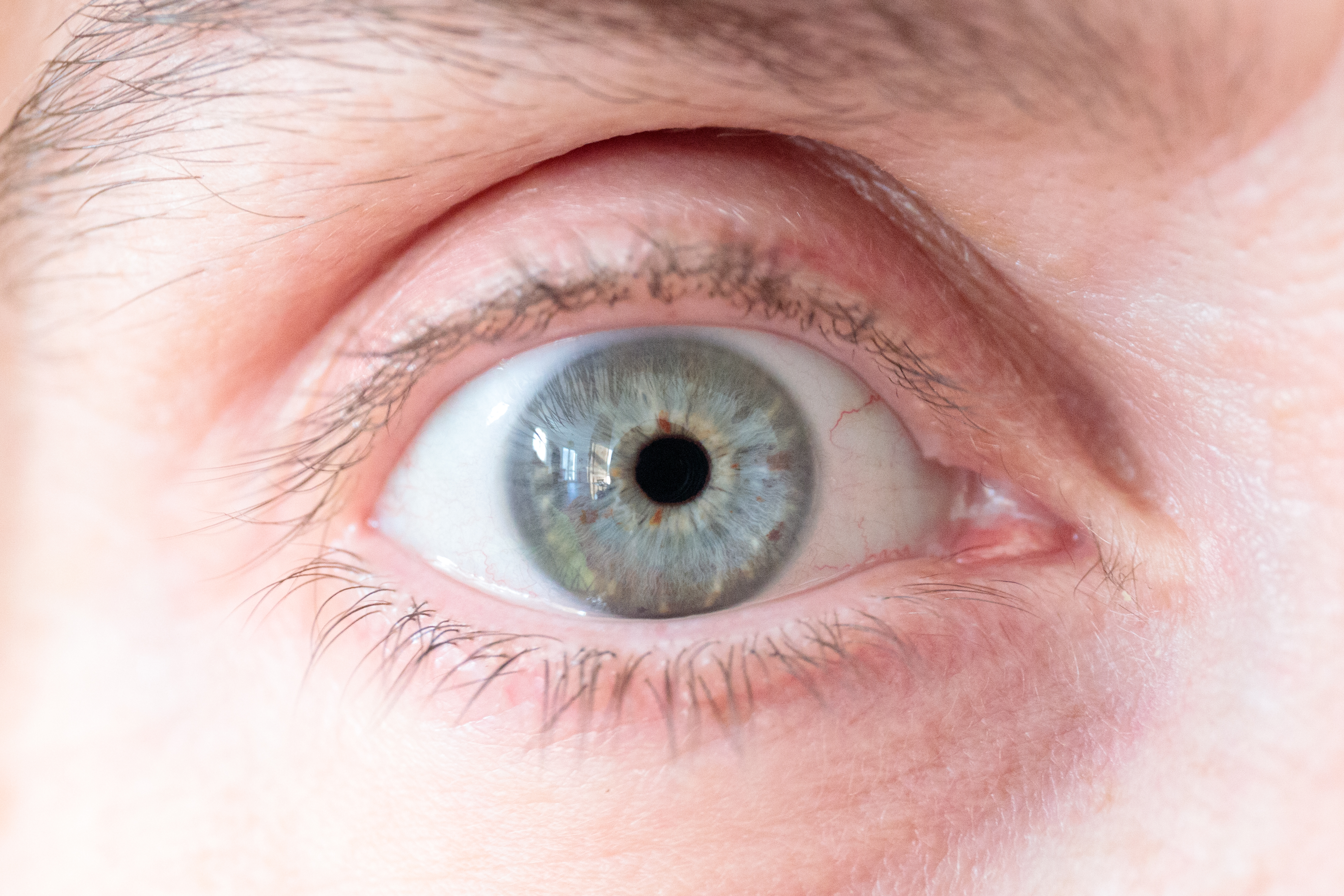
Gray eye

Like blue eyes, gray eyes have a dark epithelium at the back of the iris and a relatively clear stroma at the front. One possible explanation for the difference in appearance between gray and blue eyes is that gray eyes have larger deposits of collagen in the stroma, so that the light that is reflected from the epithelium undergoes Mie scattering (which is not strongly frequency-dependent) rather than Rayleigh scattering (in which shorter wavelengths of light are scattered more). This would be analogous to the change in the color of the sky, from the blue given by the Rayleigh scattering of sunlight by small gas molecules when the sky is clear, to the gray caused by Mie scattering of large water droplets when the sky is cloudy. Alternatively, it has been suggested that gray and blue eyes might differ in the concentration of melanin at the front of the stroma.

Gray eyes can also be found among the Algerian Shawia people of the Aurès Mountains in Northwest Africa, in the Middle East/West Asia, Central Asia, and South Asia. In the Iliad, the Greek goddess Athene is said to have gray eyes (γλαυκῶπις). Under magnification, gray eyes exhibit small amounts of yellow and brown color in the iris.

Gray is the second-rarest natural eye color after green, with 3% of the world's population having it.

=== Special cases ===
==== Two different colors ====
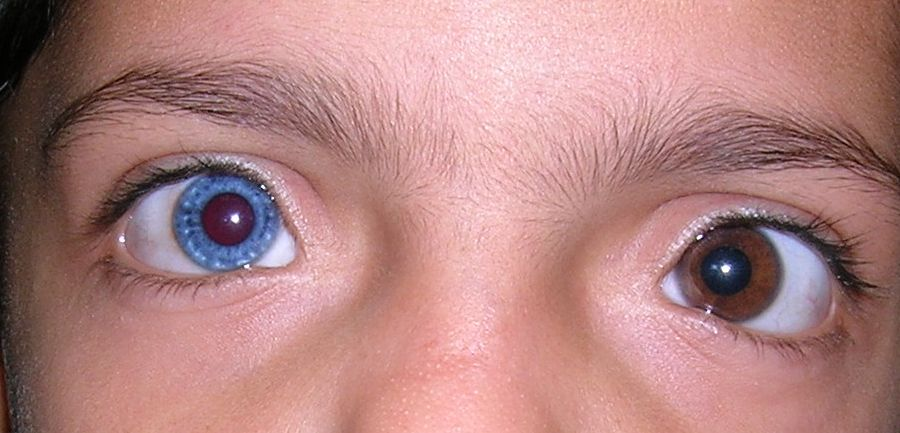
Two different eye colors are known as heterochromia iridum

As a result of heterochromia iridum, it is also possible to have two different eye colors. This occurs in humans and certain breeds of domesticated animals and affects less than 1 percent of the world's population.

==== Red and violet ====
Red-appearing albino eyes

The eyes of people with severe forms of albinism may appear red under certain lighting conditions owing to the extremely low quantities of melanin, allowing the blood vessels to show through. In addition, flash photography can sometimes cause a "red-eye effect", in which the very bright light from a flash reflects off the retina, which is abundantly vascular, causing the pupil to appear red in the photograph.

Although the deep blue eyes of some people such as Elizabeth Taylor can appear purple or violet at certain times, "true" violet-colored eyes occur only due to albinism. Eyes that appear red or violet under certain conditions due to albinism occur in less than 1 percent of the world's population.

== Medical implications ==
The most important role of melanin in the iris is to protect the eyes from the sun's harmful rays. People with lighter eye colors, such as blue or green, have lessened protection from the sun, and so need greater protection from the sun's rays than those with darker eye colors.

Those with lighter iris color have been found to have a higher prevalence of age-related macular degeneration (ARMD) than those with darker iris color; lighter eye color is also associated with an increased risk of ARMD progression. A gray iris may indicate the presence of a uveitis, and an increased risk of uveal melanoma has been found in those with blue, green or gray eyes. However, a study in 2000 suggests that people with dark brown eyes are at increased risk of developing cataracts and therefore should protect their eyes from direct exposure to sunlight.

=== Wilson's disease ===
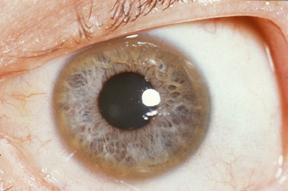
A Kayser–Fleischer ring in a patient with Wilson's disease

Wilson's disease involves a mutation of the gene coding for the enzyme ATPase 7B, which prevents copper within the liver from entering the Golgi apparatus in cells. Instead, the copper accumulates in the liver and in other tissues, including the iris of the eye. This results in the formation of Kayser–Fleischer rings, which are dark rings that encircle the periphery of the iris.

=== Coloration of the sclera ===
Eye color outside of the iris may also be symptomatic of disease. Yellowing of the sclera (the "whites of the eyes") is associated with jaundice, and may be symptomatic of liver diseases such as cirrhosis or hepatitis. A blue coloration of the sclera may also be symptomatic of disease.

=== Aniridia ===
Aniridia is a congenital condition characterized by an extremely underdeveloped iris, which appears absent on superficial examination.

=== Ocular albinism and eye color ===
Normally, there is a thick layer of melanin on the back of the iris. Even people with the lightest blue eyes, with no melanin on the front of the iris at all, have dark brown coloration on the back of it, to prevent light from scattering around inside the eye. In those with milder forms of albinism, the color of the iris is typically blue but can vary from blue to brown. In severe forms of albinism, there is no pigment on the back of the iris, and light from inside the eye can pass through the iris to the front. In these cases, the only color seen is the red from the hemoglobin of the blood in the capillaries of the iris. Such albinos have pink eyes, as do albino rabbits, mice, or any other animal with a total lack of melanin. Transillumination defects can almost always be observed during an eye examination due to lack of iridial pigmentation. The ocular albino also lacks normal amounts of melanin in the retina as well, which allows more light than normal to reflect off the retina and out of the eye. Because of this, the pupillary reflex is much more pronounced in albino individuals, and this can emphasize the red eye effect in photographs.

=== Heterochromia ===
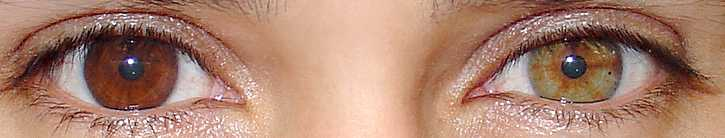
An example of complete heterochromia. The subject has one brown eye and one hazel eye.

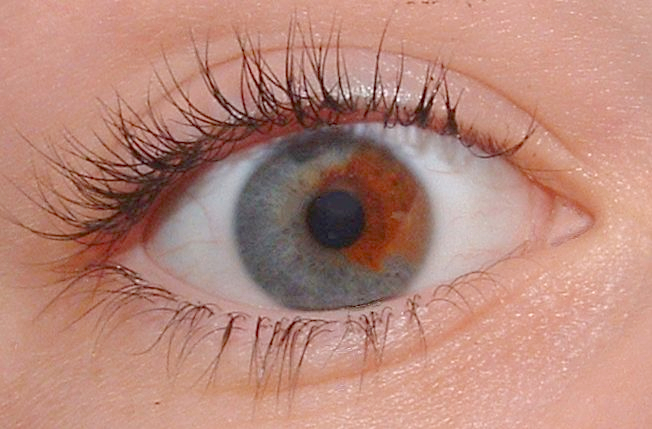
An example of sectoral heterochromia. The subject has a blue iris with a brown section.

Heterochromia (heterochromia iridum or heterochromia iridis) is an eye condition in which one iris is a different color from the other (complete heterochromia), or where a part of one iris is a different color from the remainder (partial heterochromia or sectoral heterochromia). It is a result of the relative excess or lack of pigment within an iris or part of an iris, which may be inherited or acquired by disease or injury. This uncommon condition usually results due to uneven melanin content. A number of causes are responsible, including genetic, such as chimerism, Horner's syndrome and Waardenburg syndrome.

A chimera can have two different colored eyes just like any two siblings can—because each cell has different eye color genes. A mosaic can have two different colored eyes if the DNA difference happens to be in an eye-color gene.

There are many other possible reasons for having two different-colored eyes. Pop singer David Bowie had the appearance of different eye colors due to an injury that caused one pupil to be permanently dilated.

Another hypothesis about heterochromia is that it can result from a viral infection in utero affecting the development of one eye, possibly through some sort of genetic mutation. Occasionally, heterochromia can be a sign of a serious medical condition.

A common cause in females with heterochromia is X-inactivation, which can result in a number of heterochromatic traits, such as calico cats. Trauma and certain medications, such as some prostaglandin analogues, can also cause increased pigmentation in one eye. On occasion, a difference in eye color is caused by blood staining the iris after injury.

== Limbal ring ==
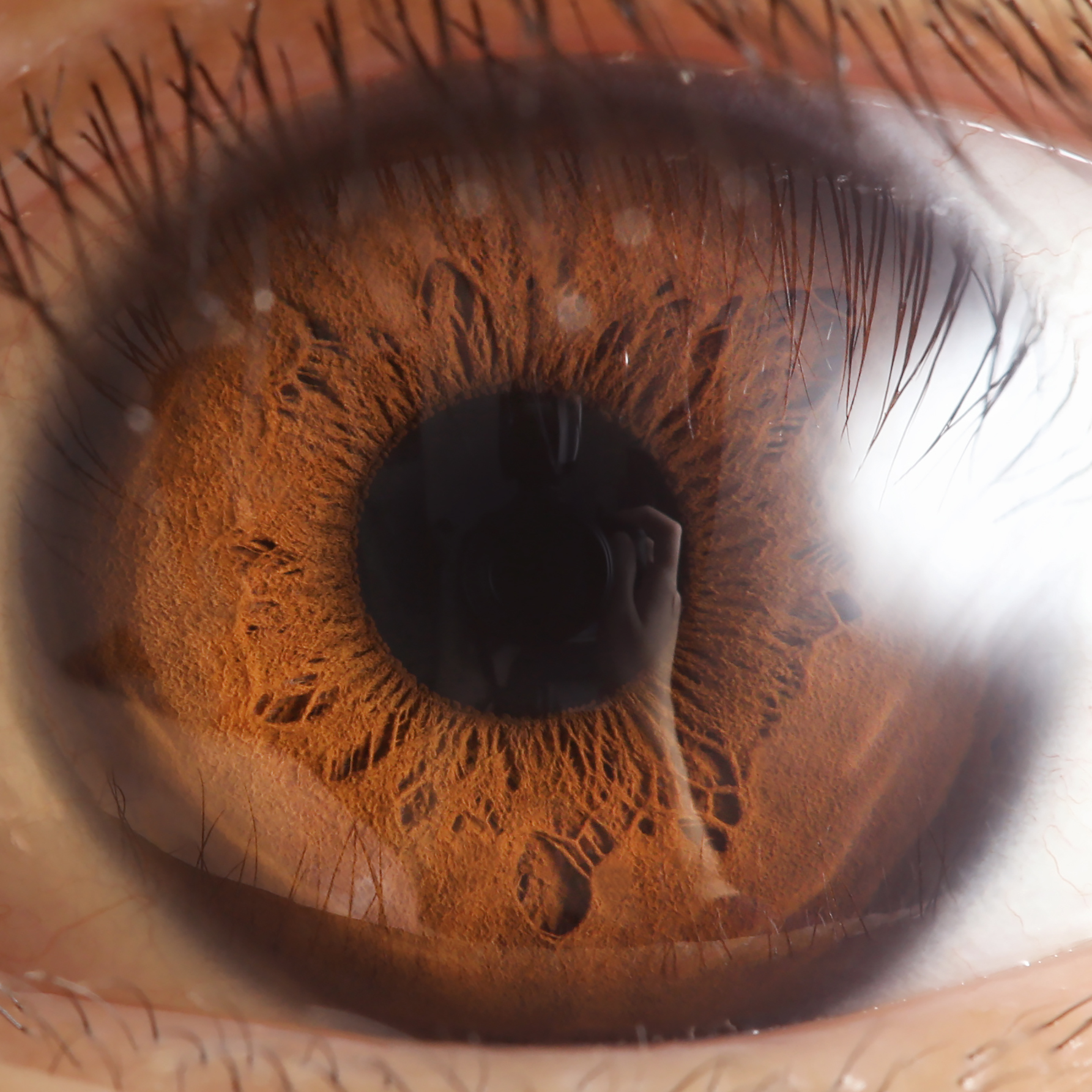
Light brown iris with a dark limbal ring

The limbal ring is also a feature of the iris contributing to eye color, appearing as a darkened, occasionally black region encircling the iris resulting from a manifestation of the optical properties of the corneal limbus. Limbal rings are not present in all individuals, and their thickness and prominence may correlate with health or youthfulness, and contributes to facial attractiveness.

== Impact on vision ==
Although people with lighter eye color are generally more sensitive to light because they have less pigment in the iris to protect them from sunlight, there is little to no evidence that eye color has a direct impact on vision qualities such as visual acuity. However, there is a study that found that dark-eyed people perform better at "reactive-type tasks", which suggests they may have better reaction times. People with light-colored eyes, however, performed better at so-called "self-paced tasks", which include activities like hitting a golf ball or throwing baseballs. In another study, people with darker eyes performed better at hitting racquetballs. There are also other studies that challenge these findings, and more study is needed to verify these results.

== Classification of color ==
Iris color can provide a large amount of information about a person, and a classification of colors may be useful in documenting pathological changes or determining how a person may respond to ocular pharmaceuticals. Classification systems have ranged from a basic light or dark description to detailed gradings employing photographic standards for comparison. Others have attempted to set objective standards of color comparison.

The Martin–Schultz scale, developed from the Martin scale, is one standard color scale used in physical anthropology to establish the eye color of an individual. It was created by the anthropologists Rudolf Martin and Bruno K Schultz in the first half of the 20th century. The scale consists of 20 colors ranging from light blue to dark brown-black, corresponding to natural eye colors caused by the amount of melanin in the iris.

Normal eye colors range from the darkest shades of brown to the lightest tints of blue. To meet the need for standardized classification, at once simple yet detailed enough for research purposes, Seddon et al. developed a graded system based on the predominant iris color and the amount of brown or yellow pigment present. There are three pigment colors that determine, depending on their proportion, the outward appearance of the iris, along with structural color. Green irises, for example, have some yellow and the blue structural color. Brown irises contain more or less melanin. Some eyes have a dark ring around the iris, called a limbal ring.

Eye color in non-human animals is regulated differently. For example, instead of blue as in humans, autosomal recessive eye color in the skink species Corucia zebrata is black, and the autosomal dominant color is yellow-green.

As the perception of color depends on viewing conditions (e.g., the amount and kind of illumination, as well as the hue of the surrounding environment), so does the perception of eye color.

== See also ==
- Hair color
- Human skin color
- Iridology
- Xanthophore
