= HERC2 =

Mammalian protein found in Homo sapiens

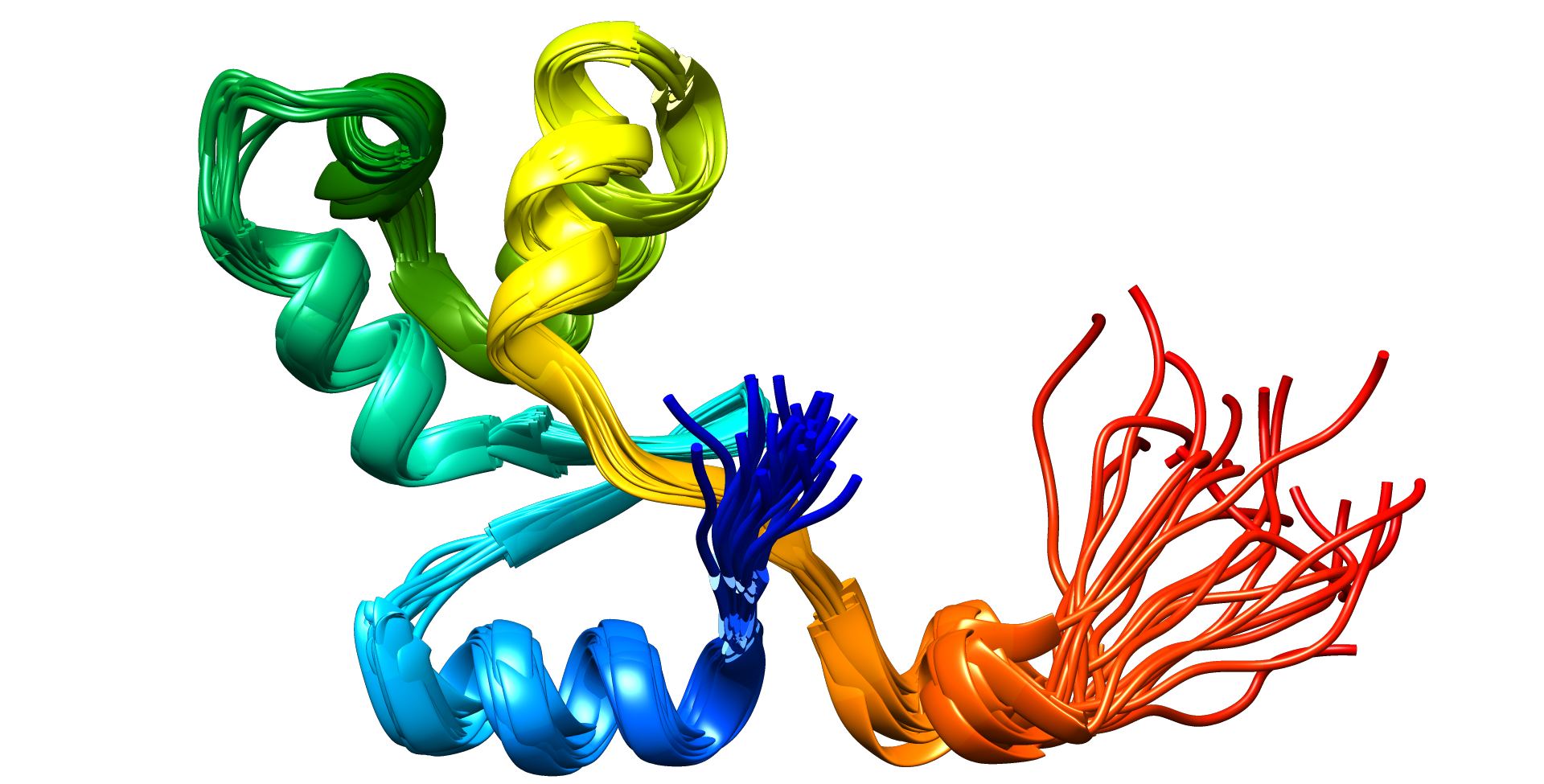

Identifiers
- Aliases: HERC2, p528, D15F37S1, MRT38, SHEP1, jdf2, HECT and RLD domain containing E3 ubiquitin protein ligase 2, LOC107987422
- External IDs: OMIM: 605837; MGI: 103234; GeneCards: HERC2
Available structures
PDB	Ortholog search: PDBe RCSB
PDB	List of PDB id codes 2KEO, 3KCI, 4L1M
Enzyme activity
EC #	BRENDA	ExPASy	KEGG	MetaCyc
2.3.2.26	↗	↗	↗	↗

Gene location (Human)
Chr.	Chromosome 15 (human)
Band	15q13.1	Start	28,111,040 bp
Band	15q13.1	End	28,322,179 bp

Gene location (Mouse)
Chr.	Chromosome 7 (mouse)
Band	7 B5|7 33.42 cM	Start	55,699,944 bp
Band	7 B5|7 33.42 cM	End	55,881,548 bp
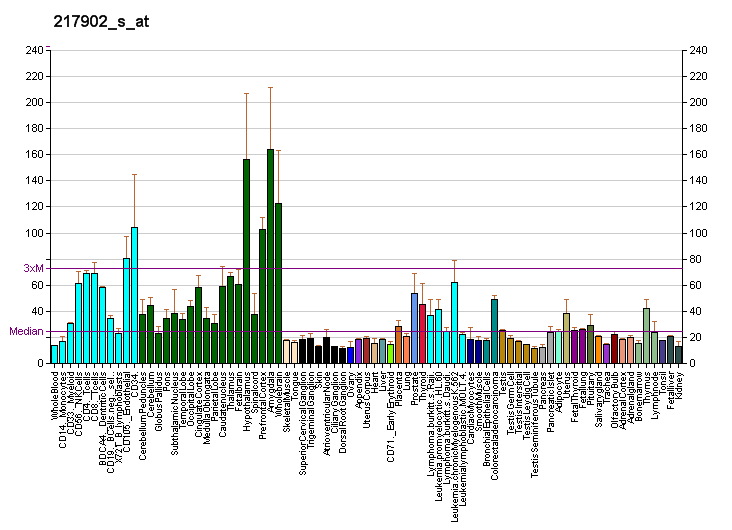

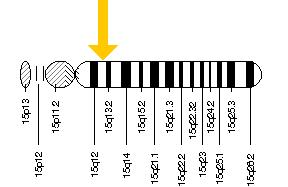
RNA expression pattern
Bgee	Human / Mouse (ortholog); Top expressed in: sural nerve; right hemisphere of cerebellum; pituitary gland; corpus callosum; muscle layer of sigmoid colon; anterior pituitary; superior frontal gyrus; right frontal lobe; prefrontal cortex; primary visual cortex / Top expressed in: secondary oocyte; superior frontal gyrus; dentate gyrus of hippocampal formation granule cell; neural layer of retina; zygote; medial dorsal nucleus; muscle of thigh; ventral tegmental area; cerebellar cortex; medial vestibular nucleus; More reference expression data
BioGPS	More reference expression data
Gene ontology
Molecular function	guanyl-nucleotide exchange factor activity; zinc ion binding; metal ion binding; SUMO binding; ubiquitin-protein transferase activity; protein binding; ubiquitin protein ligase binding; transferase activity; ubiquitin protein ligase activity
Cellular component	cytoplasm; membrane; nucleoplasm; mitochondrial inner membrane; centriole; cytoskeleton; nucleus
Biological process	cellular response to DNA damage stimulus; protein ubiquitination; spermatogenesis; intracellular protein transport; double-strand break repair via nonhomologous end joining; DNA repair; proteasome-mediated ubiquitin-dependent protein catabolic process; regulation of molecular function
Sources:Amigo / QuickGO
Orthologs
Databases	NCBI: entry; OMA: entry
Species	Human	Mouse
Entrez	8924	15204
Ensembl	ENSG00000128731; ENSG00000276802; ENSG00000277278	ENSMUSG00000030451
UniProt	O95714	Q4U2R1
RefSeq (mRNA)	NM_004667	NM_010418; NM_001360080
RefSeq (protein)	NP_004658	NP_034548; NP_001347009
Location (UCSC)	Chr 15: 28.11 – 28.32 Mb	Chr 7: 55.7 – 55.88 Mb
PubMed search
- Wikidata
View/Edit Human	View/Edit Mouse

HERC2, or HECT and RLD domain containing E3 ubiquitin protein ligase 2, is a giant E3 ubiquitin protein ligase, implicated in DNA repair regulation, pigmentation and neurological disorders. It is encoded by a gene of the same name belonging to the HERC family, which typically encodes large protein products with C-terminal HECT domains and one or more RCC1-like (RLD) domains.

== History ==
HERC2, previously referred to as the rjs gene locus, was first identified in 1990 as the gene responsible for two phenotypes in mice: the runty, jerky, sterile (rjs) phenotype and the juvenile development and fertility-2 (Jdf2) phenotype. Mutant alleles are known to cause hypo-pigmentation and pink eye phenotypes, as well reduced growth, jerky gait, male sterility, female semi-sterility, and maternal behaviour defects in mice.

== Gene locus ==
The full HERC2 gene is located at 15q13, encoded by 93 exons and its transcription is under the control of a CpG rich promoter. This region on chromosome 15 is susceptible to breaks during chromosomal rearrangement and there are at least 12 partial duplicates of HERC2 between 15q11–15q13.

At least 15 SNPs in the HERC2 gene have been identified in introns and they are strongly associated with human iris colour variability, functioning to repress expression of the neighboring downstream gene OCA2.

== Protein structure ==
HERC2 encodes a 4834-amino acid protein with a theoretical size of 528 kDa. While a full structure has not yet been elucidated, potentially due to its large size, partial structures of its domains have been captured.

It has an N-terminal bilobed HECT domain, conferring E3 ligase functionality, as well as 3 RLD domains with seven-bladed β-propeller folds. In addition to these HERC family hallmarks, it has several other motifs; a cytochrome-b5-like domain, several potential phosphorylation sites, and a ZZ-type zinc finger motif. This is likely involved in protein binding, and has recently been identified as a SUMOylation target following DNA damage.

Expression of HERC2 is ubiquitous, though particularly high in the brain and testes. Cellular localisation is predominantly to the nucleus and cytoplasm.

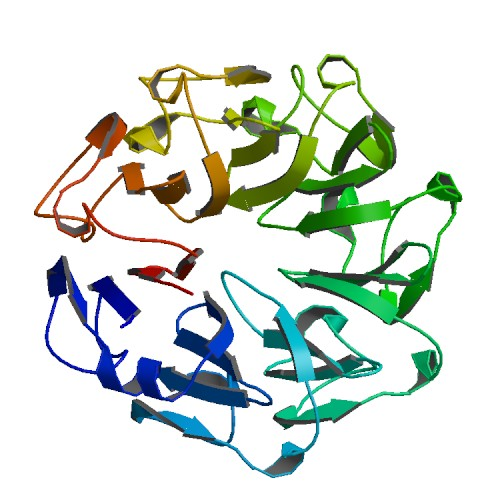
The third RLD domain of HERC2, captured at 1.8 Å by X-ray diffraction (3KCI)

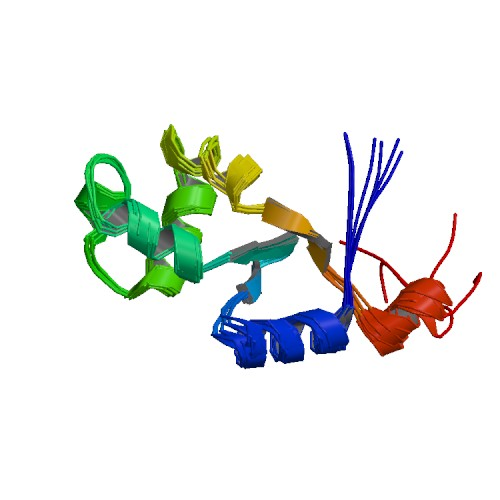
The cytochrome-b5-like domain of HERC2, captured with NMR spectroscopy (2KEO)

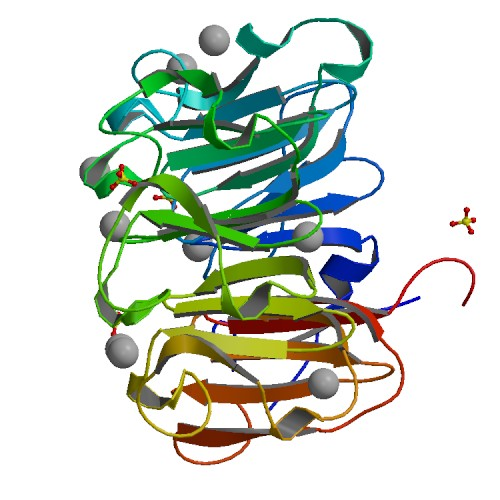
The first RLD domain of HERC2, captured at 2.6 Å by X-ray diffraction (4L1M)

== Protein function ==
=== Pigmentation ===
SNPs found within the HERC2 gene are strongly associated with iris colour variability in humans, through effects on the expression of the downstream gene OCA2. In particular, two intronic SNPs, rs916977 and rs12913832, have been reported as good predictors of this trait, and the latter is also significantly associated with skin and hair colour. Nonetheless, the ancestral allele is associated with darker pigmentation and dominant over the lighter pigment recessive allele. The rs12913832 SNP, located in intron 86 of the HERC2 gene contains a silencing sequence that can inhibit the expression of OCA2 and, if two copies of the recessive allele are present, can result in blue eyes. This genotype is present in almost all people with blue eyes and is hypothesised as being the founder mutation of blue eyes in humans.

The rs916977 SNP is most common in Europe; particularly in the north and east, where it nears fixation. The variant is also found at high frequencies in North Africa, the Near East, Oceania and the Americas.

=== DNA repair pathways ===
HERC2 is a component of the replication fork and essential for DNA damage repair pathways. Regulating DNA repair pathways is necessary, as unchecked they can target and excise undamaged DNA, potentially leading to mutation.

It is involved in coordinating the Chk1-directed DNA damage/cell cycle checkpoint response by regulating the stability of the deubiquitination enzyme USP20. Under normal conditions HERC2 associates with USP20 and ubiquitinates it for degradation. Under replication stress, for example a DNA polymerase mismatch error, USP20 disassociates from HERC2 and deubiquitinates claspin, stabilising it to then bind and activate Chk1. This allows for DNA replication to be paused and the error corrected.

At the site of doubles stranded breaks, HERC2 facilitates the binding of RNF8, a RING finger ubiquitin ligase to the E2 ubiquitin-conjugating enzyme UBC13. This association is required for RNF8 mediated Lys-63 poly-ubiquitination signalling, which both recruits and retains repair factors at the site of DNA damage to commence homologous recombination repair.

HERC2 is also involved in regulating nucleotide excision repair by ubiquitinating the XPA repair protein for proteolysis. XPA is involved in recognising DNA damage and provides a scaffold for other repair factors to bind at the damage site.

=== Centrosome assembly ===
HERC2 has been implicated in regulating stable centrosome architecture in conjunction with NEURL4 other ubiquitinated binding partners. Its absence is associated with aberrant centrosome morphology.

=== Iron metabolism ===
HERC2 has recently been associated with regulating iron metabolism through ubiquitinating the F-box and leucine-rich repeat protein 5 (FBXL5) for proteasomal degradation. FBXL5 regulates the stability of the iron regulatory protein (IR2), which in turn controls the stability of proteins overlooking cellular iron homeostasis. Depletion of HERC2 results in decreased cellular iron levels. Iron is an essential nutrient in cells, but high levels can be cytotoxic, so maintaining cellular levels is important.

=== Other functions ===
HERC2 helps to regulate p53 signalling by facilitating the oligomerization of p53, which is necessary for its transcriptional activity. Silencing of HERC2 reportedly inhibits the expression of genes regulated by p53 and also results in increased cellular growth.

== Clinical significance ==
The 15q11-q13 locus of HERC2 is also associated with Angelman syndrome (AS), specifically when a region of this locus is deleted. Similar to the rjs phenotype attributed to HERC2 in mice, AS is associated with seizures, developmental delay, intellectual disability and jerky movements. While a variety of disturbances to this locus can cause AS, all known mechanisms affect the functioning and expression of the E6AP E3 ligase, which also sits at this locus. HER2 is an allosteric activator of E6AP, and lies at the most commonly deleted region in AS. Its deletion could result in the inactivation of E6AP and consequently the development of AS.

In Old Order Amish families, a homozygous proline to leucine missense mutation within the first RLD domain has been implicated in a neurodevelopmental disorder with autism and features resembling AS. In addition, a homozygous deletion of both OCA2 and HERC2 genes was recently reported as presenting with severe developmental abnormalities. These phenotypes are suggestive of a role for HERC2 in normal neurodevelopment.

Certain alleles of HERC2 has recently been implicated in increasing the risk of iris cancer. Due its role in pigment determination, three HERC2 SNPs have been highlighted as associated with uveal melanoma. HERC2 frameshift mutations have also been described in colorectal cancers.

In accordance to its role in facilitating p53 oligomerization, HERC2 may be causally related to Li-Fraumeni syndrome and Li-Fraumeni-like syndromes, which occur in the absence of sufficient p53 oligomerization.

== Interactions ==
HERC2 is known to interact with the following:

- RNF8
- FBXL5
- OCA2
- UBC13
- USP20
- XPA
- Claspin
- E6AP
- NEURL4
- RNF168
- BRCA1
- p53
- LRRK2

== Evolution ==
The HERC2 variation for blue eyes first appears around 14,000 years ago in Italy and the Caucasus.

== See also ==
- Angelman Syndrome
- Eye color
- DNA repair pathways
