= FBXL7 =

Protein-coding gene in humans

Identifiers
- Aliases: FBXL7, FBL6, FBL7, F-box and leucine-rich repeat protein 7, F-box and leucine rich repeat protein 7
- External IDs: OMIM: 605656; MGI: 3052506; GeneCards: FBXL7

Gene location (Human)
Chr.	Chromosome 5 (human)
Band	5p15.1	Start	15,500,180 bp
Band	5p15.1	End	15,939,795 bp

Gene location (Mouse)
Chr.	Chromosome 15 (mouse)
Band	15|15 B1	Start	26,540,545 bp
Band	15|15 B1	End	26,895,666 bp
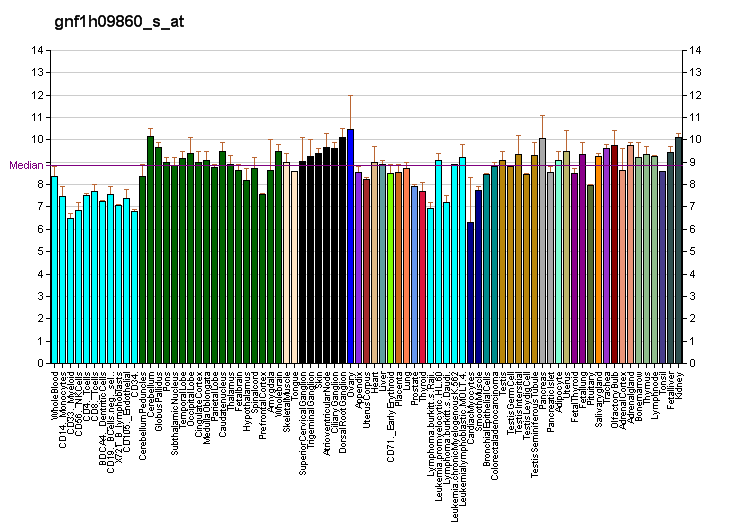
RNA expression pattern
Bgee	Human / Mouse (ortholog); Top expressed in: secondary oocyte; ventricular zone; saphenous vein; urethra; tibia; vena cava; myocardium of left ventricle; embryo; myometrium; trigeminal ganglion / Top expressed in: hand; vas deferens; lumbar spinal ganglion; gastrula; zygote; umbilical cord; genital tubercle; endocardial cushion; renal corpuscle; molar; More reference expression data
BioGPS	More reference expression data
Gene ontology
Molecular function	ubiquitin-protein transferase activity
Cellular component	cytoplasm; ubiquitin ligase complex; microtubule organizing center; centrosome; SCF ubiquitin ligase complex; cytoskeleton; cytosol
Biological process	cell division; cell cycle; cell population proliferation; G2/M transition of mitotic cell cycle; protein ubiquitination; ubiquitin-dependent protein catabolic process; protein polyubiquitination; SCF complex assembly; negative regulation of G2/M transition of mitotic cell cycle; SCF-dependent proteasomal ubiquitin-dependent protein catabolic process; mitotic cell cycle; post-translational protein modification
Sources:Amigo / QuickGO
Orthologs
Databases	NCBI: entry; OMA: entry
Species	Human	Mouse
Entrez	23194	448987
Ensembl	ENSG00000183580	ENSMUSG00000043556
UniProt	Q9UJT9	Q5BJ29
RefSeq (mRNA)	NM_001278317; NM_012304	NM_176959
RefSeq (protein)	NP_001265246; NP_036436	NP_795933
Location (UCSC)	Chr 5: 15.5 – 15.94 Mb	Chr 15: 26.54 – 26.9 Mb
PubMed search
- Wikidata
View/Edit Human	View/Edit Mouse

F-box/LRR-repeat protein 7 is a protein that in humans is encoded by the FBXL7 gene.

This gene encodes a member of the F-box protein family which is characterized by an approximately 40 amino acid motif, the F-box. The F-box proteins constitute one of the four subunits of ubiquitin protein ligase complex called SCFs (SKP1-cullin-F-box), which function in phosphorylation-dependent ubiquitination.

The F-box proteins are divided into 3 classes: Fbws containing WD40 domains, Fbls containing leucine-rich repeats, and Fbxs containing either different protein-protein interaction modules or no recognizable motifs. The protein encoded by this gene belongs to the Fbls class and, in addition to an F-box, contains several tandem leucine-rich repeats.
