= AnkB F-Box =

Protein

AnkB F-Box is a protein excreted by Legionella pneumophila which contains a domain F-box.

F-box proteins are involved in the ubiquitination of proteins targeted for degradation by the proteasome. AnkB F-box is a protein that assembles host cell polyubiquitinated proteins on the cytoplasmatic side of Legionella containing vacuole (LCV).

This effector is required for intracellular proliferation within human and amoeba cells and for intrapulmonary Legionella proliferation in mice. The presence of the F-box domain is an example of molecular mimicry of eukaryotic F-box by which Legionella exploits the proteasomal degradation capacity of the host cell for its own sake.
