= Martin scale =

Older version of color scale

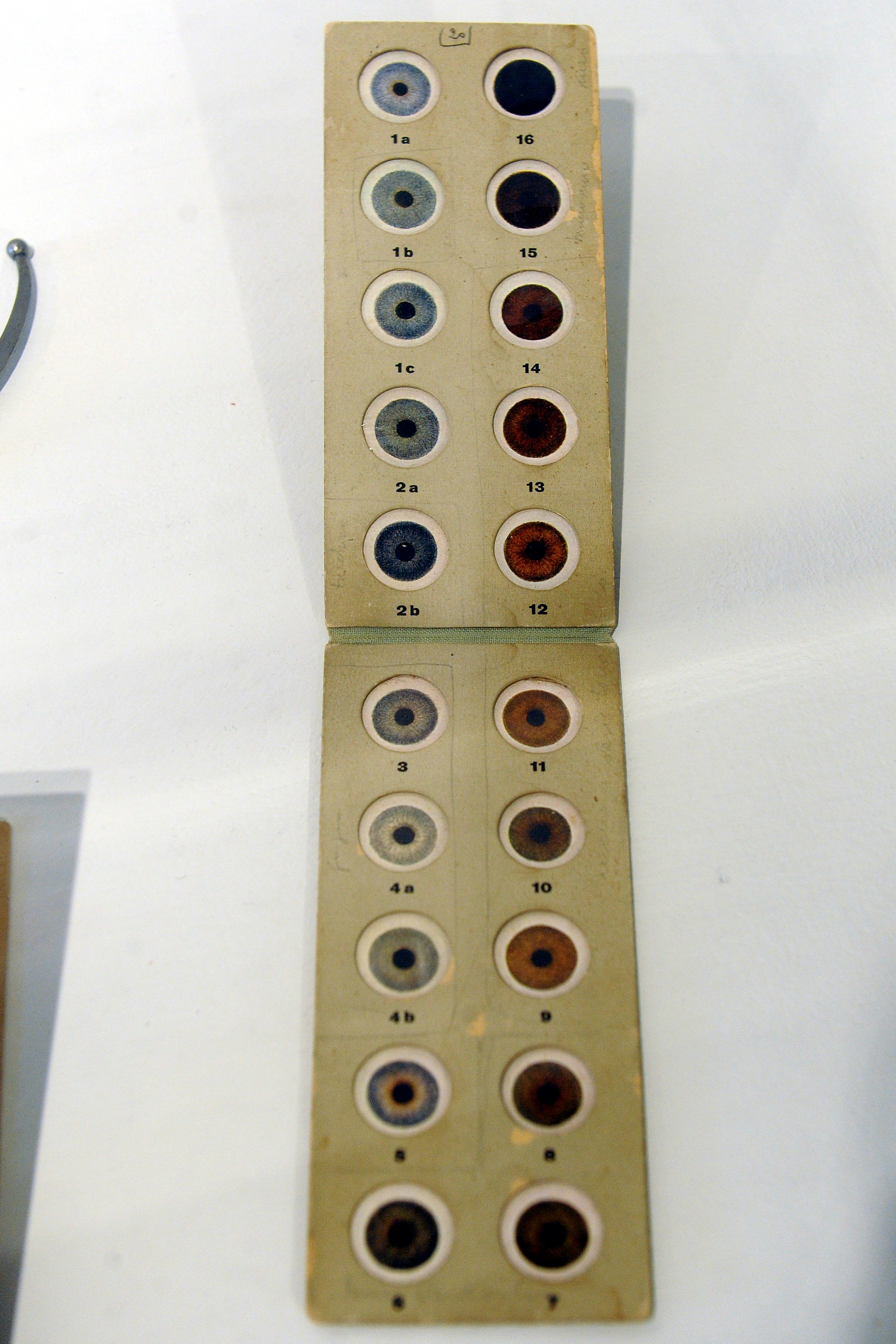
Martin-Schultz scale

The Martin scale is an older version of color scale commonly used in physical anthropology to establish more or less precisely the eye color of an individual. It was created by the anthropologist Rudolf Martin in the first half of the 20th century. Later he improved this scale with cooperation of Bruno K. Schultz, leading to the Martin-Schultz scale.

== Original scale ==
The original Martin scale, summarized below, consists of 16 colors (from light blue to dark brown-black) that correspond to the different eye colors observed in nature due to the amount of melanin in the iris. The numbering is reversed in order to match the Martin–Schultz scale, which is still used in biological anthropology. In this case, the higher the number, the lighter the eye color.

=== Light and light-mixed eyes (16-9) ===
- 16: light-blue iris
- 15-14-13: blue iris
- 12-11: light-gray iris
- 10-9: dark-gray iris

=== Mixed eyes (8-7) ===
- 8: green iris
- 7: green-brown iris

=== Dark-mixed eyes (6-5) ===
- 6: hazel iris
- 5: light-brown iris

=== Dark eyes (4-1) ===
- 4: brown iris
- 3-2: dark-brown iris
- 1: black-brown iris

== Older versions ==
Older versions of the Martin scale eye color chart have the following color divisions:

- 16-12: light and light-mixed iris
- 11-7: mixed iris
- 6-5: dark-mixed iris
- 4-1: dark iris

== See also ==
- Eye color
- Martin–Schultz scale
- Human eye
