= FBXO9 =

Protein-coding gene in the species Homo sapiens

Identifiers
- Aliases: FBXO9, FBX9, NY-REN-57, VCIA1, dJ341E18.2, F-box protein 9
- External IDs: OMIM: 609091; MGI: 1918788; GeneCards: FBXO9

Gene location (Human)
Chr.	Chromosome 6 (human)
Band	6p12.1	Start	53,051,991 bp
Band	6p12.1	End	53,100,873 bp

Gene location (Mouse)
Chr.	Chromosome 9 (mouse)
Band	9|9 E1	Start	77,988,781 bp
Band	9|9 E1	End	78,016,347 bp
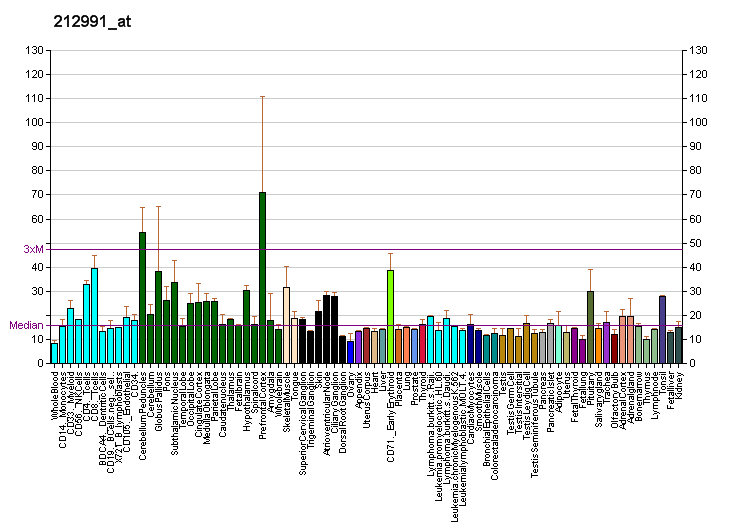

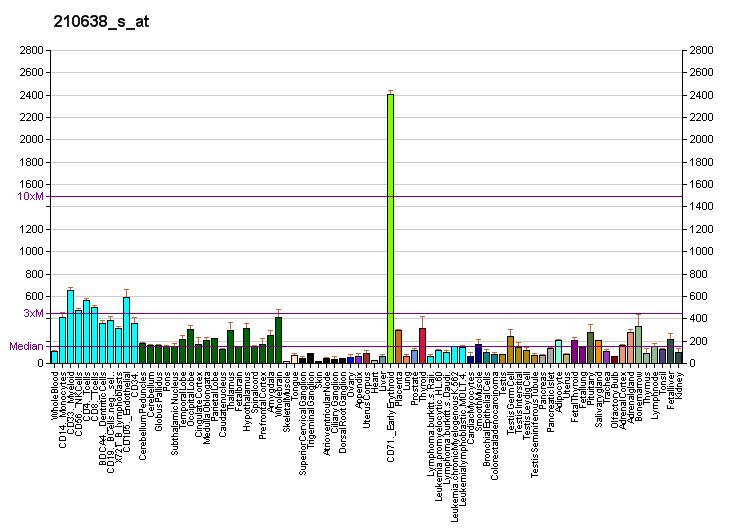

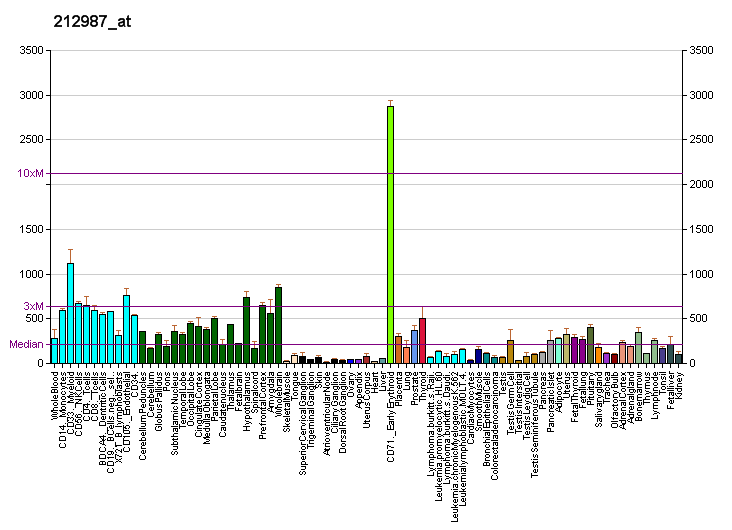
RNA expression pattern
Bgee	Human / Mouse (ortholog); Top expressed in: endothelial cell; Brodmann area 23; middle temporal gyrus; right adrenal gland; right adrenal cortex; secondary oocyte; left adrenal gland; trabecular bone; left adrenal cortex; tibia / Top expressed in: medial vestibular nucleus; blood; ciliary body; retinal pigment epithelium; dorsal tegmental nucleus; pontine nuclei; deep cerebellar nuclei; motor neuron; medial geniculate nucleus; ventral tegmental area; More reference expression data
BioGPS	More reference expression data
Gene ontology
Molecular function	protein binding; ubiquitin-protein transferase activity
Cellular component	cytoplasm; ubiquitin ligase complex; SCF ubiquitin ligase complex; cytosol
Biological process	SCF-dependent proteasomal ubiquitin-dependent protein catabolic process; innate immune response; regulation of TOR signaling; fat cell differentiation; protein ubiquitination; protein polyubiquitination; post-translational protein modification
Sources:Amigo / QuickGO
Orthologs
Databases	NCBI: entry; OMA: entry
Species	Human	Mouse
Entrez	26268	71538
Ensembl	ENSG00000112146	ENSMUSG00000001366
UniProt	Q9UK97	Q8BK06
RefSeq (mRNA)	NM_012347; NM_033480; NM_033481	NM_001081490; NM_023605
RefSeq (protein)	NP_036479; NP_258441; NP_258442	NP_001074959; NP_076094
Location (UCSC)	Chr 6: 53.05 – 53.1 Mb	Chr 9: 77.99 – 78.02 Mb
PubMed search
- Wikidata
View/Edit Human	View/Edit Mouse

F-box only protein 9 is a protein that in humans is encoded by the FBXO9 gene.

This gene encodes a member of the F-box protein family which is characterized by an approximately 40 amino acid motif, the F-box. The F-box proteins constitute one of the four subunits of the ubiquitin protein ligase complex called SCFs (SKP1-cullin-F-box), which function in phosphorylation-dependent ubiquitination. The F-box proteins are divided into 3 classes: Fbws containing WD-40 domains, Fbls containing leucine-rich repeats, and Fbxs containing either different protein-protein interaction modules or no recognizable motifs. The protein encoded by this gene belongs to the Fbxs class. Alternative splicing of this gene generates at least 3 transcript variants diverging at the 5' terminus.
