= Stephanie Martin (disambiguation) =

Stephanie Martin (fl. 1991–2016) is an American and Canadian singer-songwriter and actress.

Stephanie Martin or variants may also refer to:

- Stephanie Martin (composer) (born 1962), Canadian composer, conductor, and associate professor of music at York University
- Stefanie Martin, (1877–1954), German biological anthropologist

== See also ==
- Stéphane Martine (born 1978), French footballer
