= Martin–Schultz scale =

Standard color scale

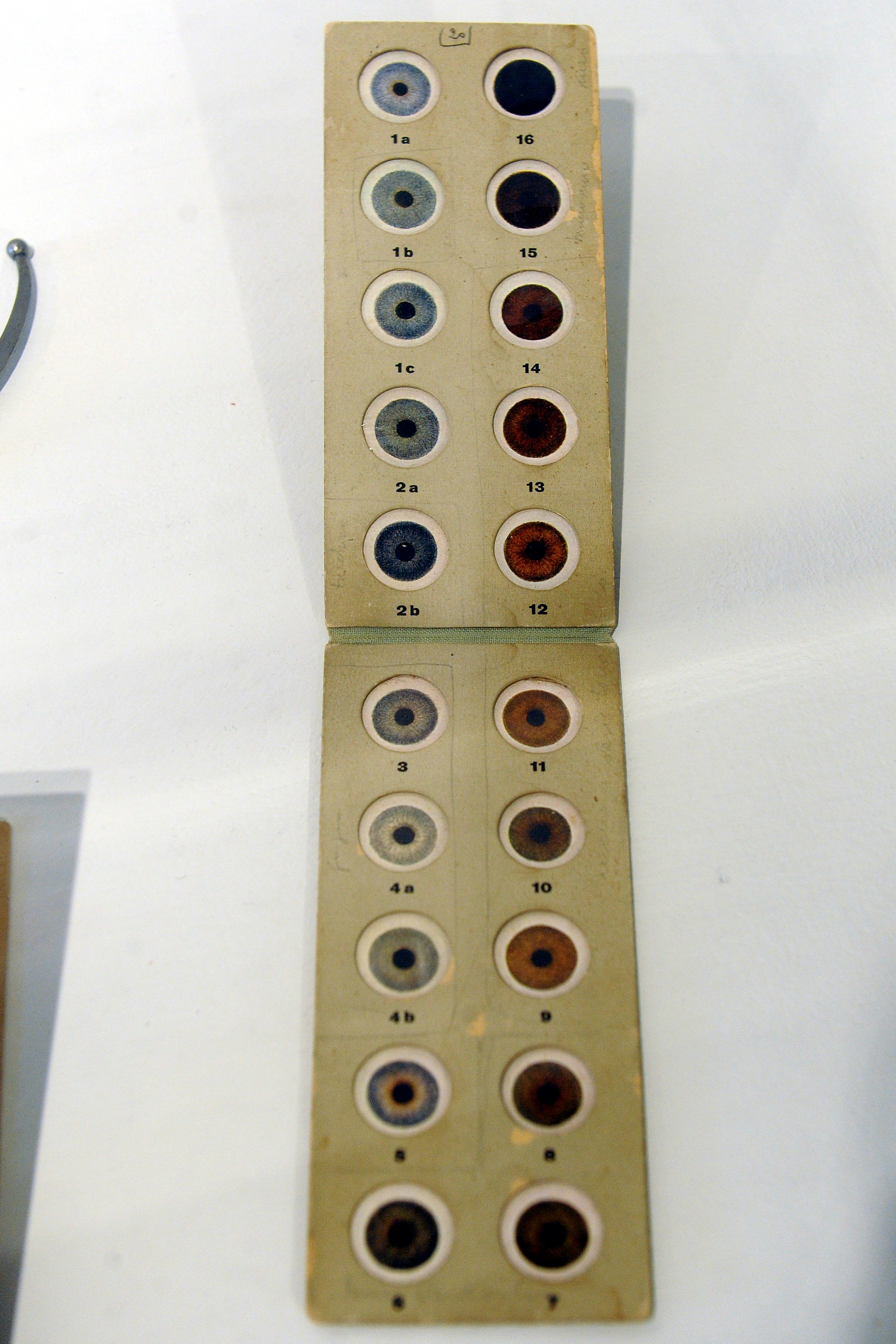
Martin-Schultz scale

The Martin–Schultz scale is a standard color scale commonly used in physical anthropology to establish more or less precisely the eye color of an individual; it was created by the anthropologists Rudolf Martin and Bruno K Schultz in the first half of the 20th century. The scale consists of 20 colors (from light blue to dark brown-black) that correspond to the different eye colors observed in nature due to the amount of melanin in the iris (in this case, the lower the number, the lighter the eye color):

Color	Name	Martin–Schultz scale
	pale-blue iris	1a
	light-blue iris	1b
	sky-blue iris	1c
	blue iris	2a
	dark-blue iris	2b
	blue-gray iris	3
	light-gray iris	4a
	dark-gray iris	4b
	blue-gray iris with yellow/brown spots	5
	gray-green iris with yellow/brown spots	6
	green iris	7
	green iris with yellow/brown spots	8
	amber iris	9
	hazel iris	10
	light-brown iris	11
	medium-brown iris	12
	dark-brown iris	13
	mahogany iris	14
	black-brown iris	15
	black iris	16

== See also ==
- Eye color
- Martin scale
- Human eye
