= Allele =

Variant of DNA sequence at a locus

An allele (UK: /ˈæliːl, əˈliːl/) is a variant of the sequence of nucleotides at a particular location, or locus, on a DNA molecule.

Alleles can differ at a single position through single-nucleotide polymorphisms, but they can also have insertions and deletions of up to several thousand base pairs. Most alleles result in little or no change in the characteristics of an individual organism but sometimes different alleles can result in different observable phenotypic traits such as antibiotic resistance in bacteria, developmental mutations in fruit flies, and genetic diseases in humans.

Nearly all multicellular organisms have two sets of chromosomes at some point in their biological life cycle; that is, they are diploid. For a given locus, if the two chromosomes contain the same allele, they, and the organism, are homozygous with respect to that allele. If the alleles are different, they, and the organism, are heterozygous with respect to those alleles. A notable example of this is Gregor Mendel's discovery that the white and purple flower colors in pea plants were the result of a single gene with two alleles. Mendel's discovery of what are now known as alleles resulted in three laws that help understand how alleles are passed on to progeny.

Popular definitions of 'allele' typically refer only to different alleles within genes. For example, the ABO blood grouping is controlled by the ABO gene, which has six common alleles (variants). In population genetics, nearly every living human's phenotype for the ABO gene is some combination of just these six alleles.

== Etymology ==
The word "allele" is a short form of "allelomorph" ("other form", a word coined by British geneticists William Bateson and Edith Rebecca Saunders in the early 1900s), which was used in the early days of genetics to describe variant forms of a gene detected in different phenotypes and identified to cause the differences between them. It derives from the Greek prefix ἀλληλο-, allelo-, meaning "mutual", "reciprocal", or "each other", which itself is related to the Greek adjective ἄλλος, allos (cognate with Latin alius), meaning "other".

== Alleles that lead to dominant or recessive phenotypes ==
In many cases, genotypic interactions between the two alleles at a locus can be described as dominant or recessive, according to which of the two homozygous phenotypes the heterozygote most resembles. Where the heterozygote is indistinguishable from one of the homozygotes, the allele expressed is the one that leads to the "dominant" phenotype, and the other allele is said to be "recessive". In the case of a heterozygote, the dominant allele will mask the effect of the recessive allele, giving a dominant phenotype. The phenotype of recessive alleles are observable when an organism is homozygous recessive for a gene. The degree and pattern of dominance varies among loci. This type of interaction was first formally-described by Gregor Mendel. However, many traits defy this simple categorization and the phenotypes are modelled by co-dominance and polygenic inheritance.

The term "wild type" allele is sometimes used to describe an allele that is thought to contribute to the typical phenotypic character as seen in "wild" populations of organisms, such as fruit flies (Drosophila melanogaster). Such a "wild type" allele was historically regarded as leading to a dominant (overpowering – always expressed), common, and normal phenotype, in contrast to "mutant" alleles that lead to recessive, rare, and frequently deleterious phenotypes. It was formerly thought that most individuals were homozygous for the "wild type" allele at most gene loci, and that any alternative "mutant" allele was found in homozygous form in a small minority of "affected" individuals, often as genetic diseases, and more frequently in heterozygous form in "carriers" for the mutant allele. It is now appreciated that most or all gene loci are highly polymorphic, with multiple alleles, whose frequencies vary from population to population, and that a great deal of genetic variation is hidden in the form of alleles that do not produce obvious phenotypic differences. Wild type alleles are often denoted by a superscript plus sign (i.e., p^{+} for an allele p).

== Multiple alleles ==
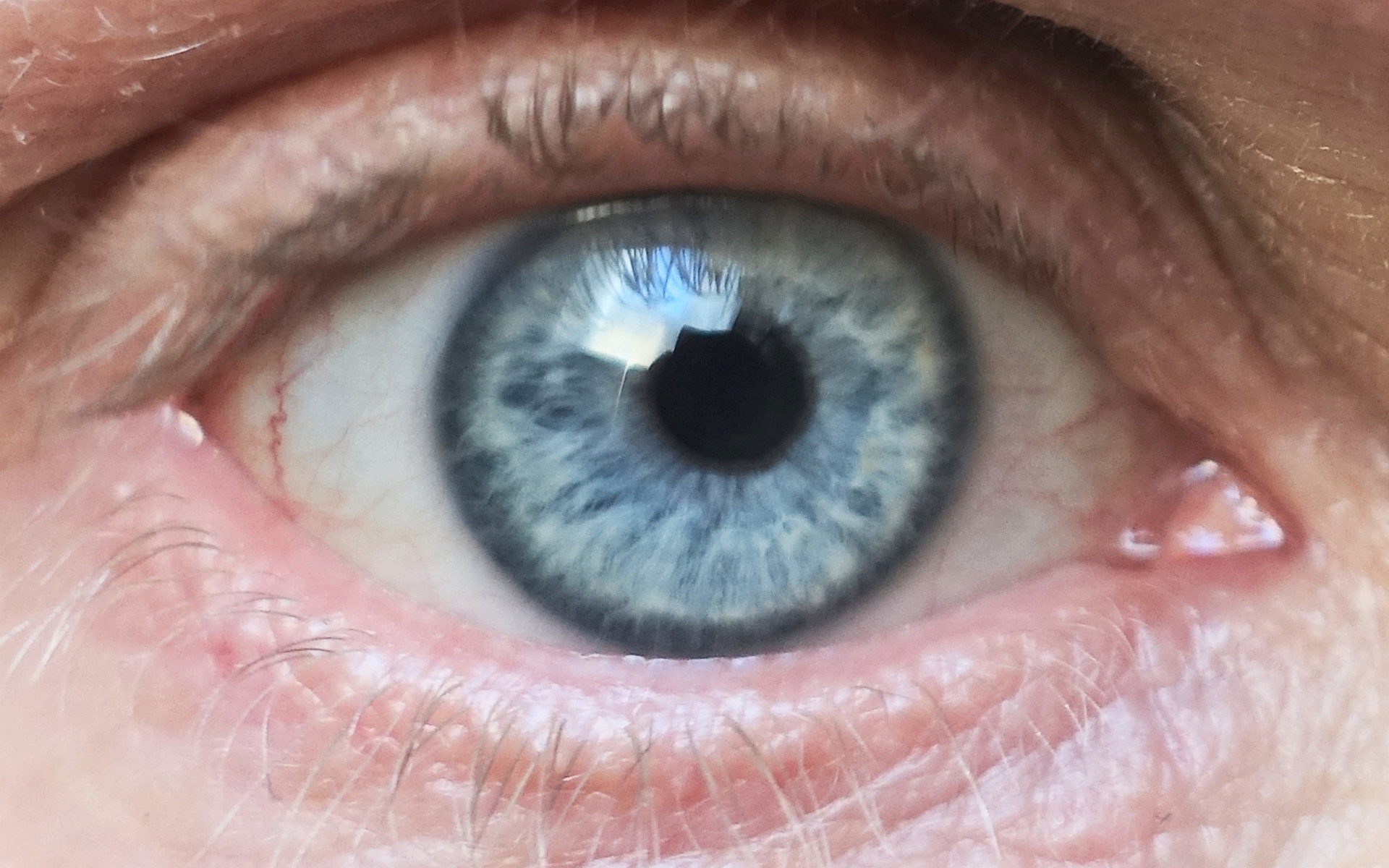
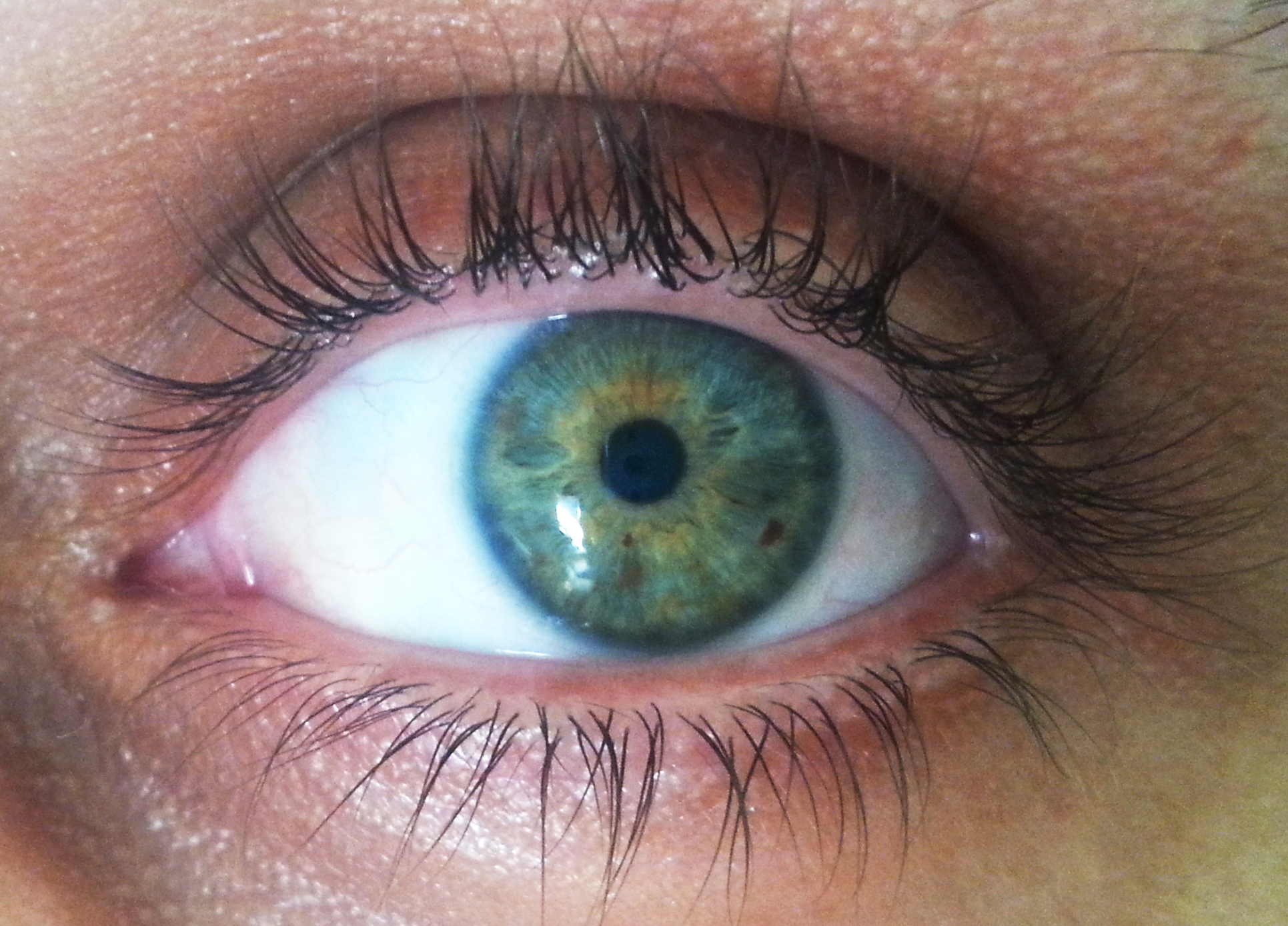
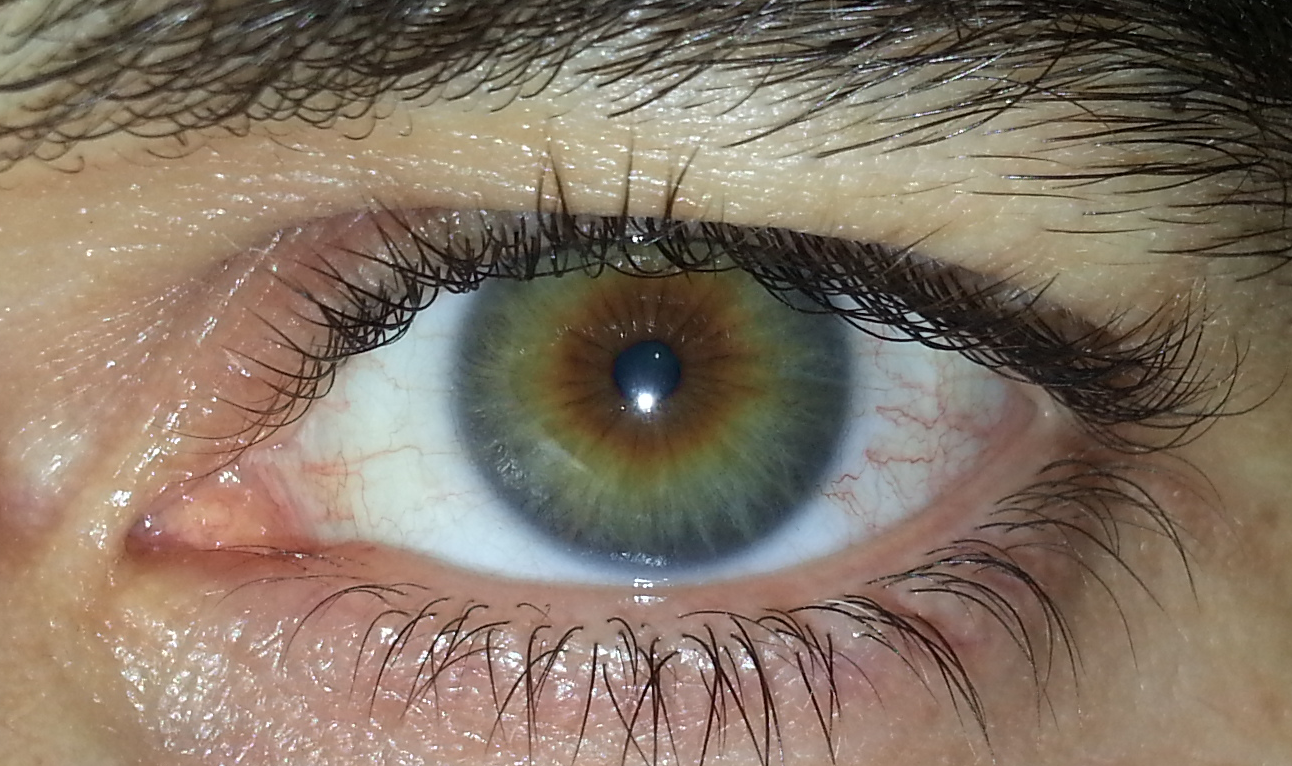
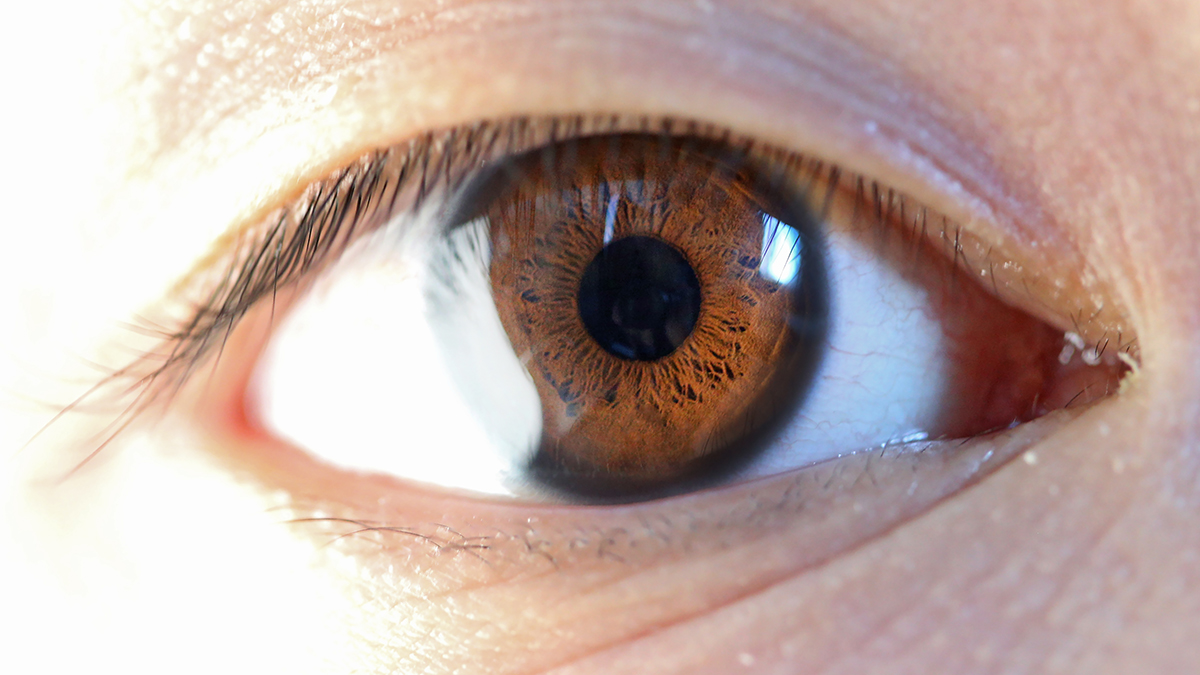
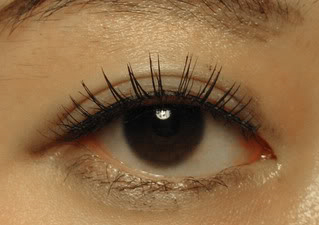
Eye color is an inherited trait influenced by more than one gene, including OCA2 and HERC2. The interaction of multiple genes—and the variation in these genes ("alleles") between individuals—help to determine a person's eye color phenotype. Eye color is influenced by pigmentation of the iris and the frequency-dependence of the light scattering by the turbid medium within the stroma of the iris.

In the ABO blood group system, a person with Type A blood displays A-antigens and may have a genotype I^{A}I^{A} or I^{A}i. A person with Type B blood displays B-antigens and may have the genotype I^{B}I^{B} or I^{B}i. A person with Type AB blood displays both A- and B-antigens and has the genotype I^{A}I^{B} and a person with Type O blood, displaying neither antigen, has the genotype ii.

A population or species of organisms typically includes multiple alleles at each locus among various individuals. Allelic variation at a locus is measurable as the number of alleles (polymorphism) present, or the proportion of heterozygotes in the population. A null allele is a gene variant that lacks the gene's normal function because it either is not expressed, or the expressed protein is inactive.

For example, at the gene locus for the ABO blood type carbohydrate antigens in humans, classical genetics recognizes three alleles, I^{A}, I^{B}, and i, which determine compatibility of blood transfusions. Any individual has one of six possible genotypes (I^{A}I^{A}, I^{A}i, I^{B}I^{B}, I^{B}i, I^{A}I^{B}, and ii) which produce one of four possible phenotypes: "Type A" (produced by I^{A}I^{A} homozygous and I^{A}i heterozygous genotypes), "Type B" (produced by I^{B}I^{B} homozygous and I^{B}i heterozygous genotypes), "Type AB" produced by I^{A}I^{B} heterozygous genotype, and "Type O" produced by ii homozygous genotype. (It is now known that each of the A, B, and O alleles is actually a class of multiple alleles with different DNA sequences that produce proteins with identical properties: more than 70 alleles are known at the ABO locus. Hence an individual with "Type A" blood may be an AO heterozygote, an AA homozygote, or an AA heterozygote with two different "A" alleles.)

== Genotype frequencies ==
The frequency of alleles in a diploid population can be used to predict the frequencies of the corresponding genotypes (see Hardy–Weinberg principle). For a simple model, with two alleles;

$$p + q=1 \,$$

$$p^2 + 2pq + q^2=1 \,$$

where p is the frequency of one allele and q is the frequency of the alternative allele, which necessarily sum to unity. Then, p^{2} is the fraction of the population homozygous for the first allele, 2pq is the fraction of heterozygotes, and q^{2} is the fraction homozygous for the alternative allele. If the first allele is dominant to the second then the fraction of the population that will show the dominant phenotype is p^{2} + 2pq, and the fraction with the recessive phenotype is q^{2}.

With three alleles:

$p + q + r = 1 \,$ and

$$p^2 + q^2 + r^2 + 2pq + 2pr + 2qr = 1. \,$$

In the case of multiple alleles at a diploid locus, the number of possible genotypes (G) with a number of alleles (a) is given by the expression:

$$G= \frac{a(a+1)}{2}.$$

== Allelic dominance in genetic disorders ==
A number of genetic disorders are caused when an individual inherits two recessive alleles for a single-gene trait. Recessive genetic disorders include albinism, cystic fibrosis, galactosemia, phenylketonuria (PKU), and Tay–Sachs disease. Other disorders are also due to recessive alleles, but because the gene locus is located on the X chromosome, so that males have only one copy (that is, they are hemizygous), they are more frequent in males than in females. Examples include red–green color blindness and fragile X syndrome.

Other disorders, such as Huntington's disease, occur when an individual inherits only one dominant allele.

== Epialleles ==
While heritable traits are typically studied in terms of genetic alleles, epigenetic marks such as DNA methylation can be inherited at specific genomic regions in certain species, a process termed transgenerational epigenetic inheritance. The term epiallele is used to distinguish these heritable marks from traditional alleles, which are defined by nucleotide sequence. A specific class of epiallele, the metastable epialleles, has been discovered in mice and in humans which is characterized by stochastic (probabilistic) establishment of epigenetic state that can be mitotically inherited.

== Idiomorph ==
The term "idiomorph", from Greek 'morphos' (form) and 'idio' (singular, unique), was introduced in 1990 in place of "allele" to denote sequences at the same locus in different strains that have no sequence similarity and probably do not share a common phylogenetic relationship. It is used mainly in the genetic research of mycology.

== See also ==
- Allelotype
- Allozyme
- Evolution
- Genealogical DNA test
- Allele frequency
- Haploinsufficiency
- Meiosis
- Mendelian error
- Mendelian inheritance
- Mitosis
- Penetrance
- Polymorphism
- Punnett square
- Single-nucleotide polymorphism
