= P protein =

Protein-coding gene in humans

OCA2

Identifiers
- Aliases: OCA2, BEY, BEY1, BEY2, BOCA, D15S12, EYCL, EYCL2, EYCL3, HCL3, PED, SHEP1, OCA2 melanosomal transmembrane protein, P
- External IDs: OMIM: 611409; MGI: 97454; GeneCards: OCA2

Gene location (Human)
Chr.	Chromosome 15 (human)
Band	15q12-q13.1	Start	27,754,875 bp
Band	15q12-q13.1	End	28,099,315 bp

Gene location (Mouse)
Chr.	Chromosome 7 (mouse)
Band	7 B5|7 33.44 cM	Start	55,889,508 bp
Band	7 B5|7 33.44 cM	End	56,186,266 bp
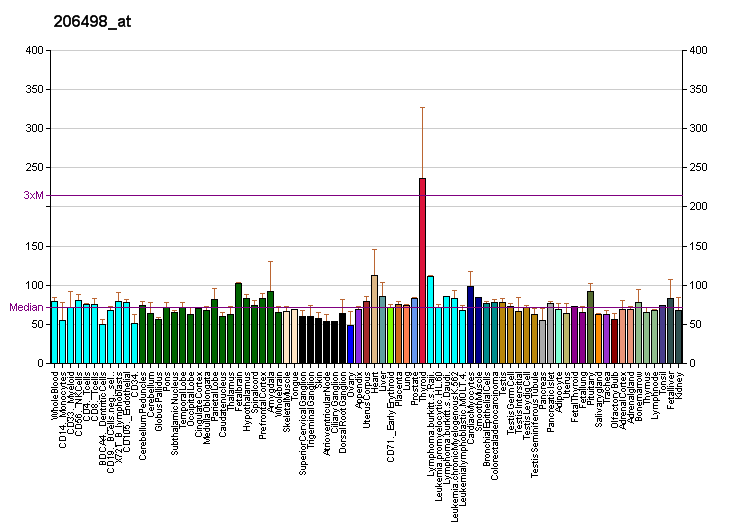
RNA expression pattern
Bgee	Human / Mouse (ortholog); Top expressed in: retinal pigment epithelium; Epithelium of choroid plexus; secondary oocyte; hair follicle; testicle; male germ cell; epithelium of nasopharynx; sperm; skin of arm; vulva / Top expressed in: iris; retinal pigment epithelium; choroid plexus of fourth ventricle; ciliary body; Epithelium of choroid plexus; hair follicle; epithelium of lens; primary oocyte; barrel cortex; corneal stroma; More reference expression data
BioGPS	More reference expression data
Gene ontology
Molecular function	transporter activity; L-tyrosine transmembrane transporter activity; protein binding
Cellular component	endoplasmic reticulum membrane; lysosomal membrane; endosome membrane; membrane; cytoplasm; melanosome membrane; integral component of membrane
Biological process	eye pigment biosynthetic process; pigmentation; developmental pigmentation; melanin biosynthetic process; cell population proliferation; transmembrane transport; spermatid development; melanocyte differentiation; tyrosine transport
Sources:Amigo / QuickGO
Orthologs
Databases	NCBI: entry; OMA: entry
Species	Human	Mouse
Entrez	4948	18431
Ensembl	ENSG00000104044; ENSG00000277361	ENSMUSG00000030450
UniProt	Q04671	Q62052
RefSeq (mRNA)	NM_000275; NM_001300984	NM_021879
RefSeq (protein)	NP_000266; NP_001287913	NP_068679
Location (UCSC)	Chr 15: 27.75 – 28.1 Mb	Chr 7: 55.89 – 56.19 Mb
PubMed search
- Wikidata
View/Edit Human	View/Edit Mouse

P protein, also known as melanocyte-specific transporter protein or pink-eyed dilution protein homolog, is a protein that in humans is encoded by the oculocutaneous albinism II (OCA2) gene. The P protein is believed to be an integral membrane protein involved in small molecule transport, specifically of tyrosine—a precursor of melanin. Certain mutations in OCA2 result in type 2 oculocutaneous albinism. OCA2 encodes the human homologue of the mouse p (pink-eyed dilution) gene.

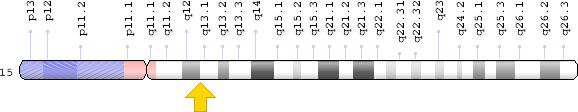
In human, the OCA2 gene is located on the long (q) arm of chromosome 15 between positions 12 and 13.1

The human OCA2 gene is located on the long arm (q) of chromosome 15, specifically from base pair 28,000,020 to base pair 28,344,457 on chromosome 15.

== Function ==
OCA2 provides instructions for making the protein called P protein which is located in melanocytes which are specialized cells that produce melanin, and in the cells of the retinal pigment epithelium. Melanin is responsible for giving color to the skin, hair, and eyes. Moreover, melanin is found in the light-sensitive tissue of the retina of the eye which plays a role in normal vision.

P protein is a component of an intracellular chloride-selective ion channel regulating melanosome pH. It is involved in melanin production essential for the normal coloring of skin, eyes, and hair. This gene seems to be the main determinant of eye color depending on the amount of melanin production in the iris stroma (large amounts giving rise to brown eyes; little to no melanin giving rise to blue eyes).

This gene is mutated in Astyanax mexicanus, a Mexican fish which is characterized by a chronic albinism in cave-dwelling individuals. It exists as a deletion in fish from the Pachón and Molino caves, which produces albinism.

== Clinical significance ==
Mutations in the OCA2 gene cause a disruption in the normal production of melanin; therefore, causing vision problems and reductions in hair, skin, and eye color. Oculocutaneous albinism caused by mutations in the OCA2 gene is called oculocutaneous albinism type 2. The prevalence of OCA type 2 is estimated at 1/38,000-1/40,000 in most populations throughout the world, with a higher prevalence in the African population of 1/3,900–1/1,500. Other diseases associated with the deletion of the OCA2 gene are Angelman syndrome (light-colored hair and fair skin) and Prader–Willi syndrome (unusually light-colored hair and fair skin). With both these syndromes, the deletion often occurs in individuals with either syndrome.

A mutation in the HERC2 gene adjacent to OCA2, affecting OCA2's expression in the human iris, is found common to nearly all people with blue eyes. It has been hypothesized that all blue-eyed humans share a single common ancestor with whom the mutation originated.

The His615Arg allele of OCA2 is involved in the light skin tone and the derived allele is restricted to East Asia with high frequencies, with highest frequencies in Eastern East Asia (49-63%), midrange frequencies in Southeast Asia, and the lowest frequencies in Western China and some Eastern European populations.
