= Allelotype =

Allelotype describes the occurrence of an allele in a population. Specifically, it describes the frequency distribution of a given set of alleles in a population. Allelotype is important for the field of population genetics, particularly when studying complex or multifactorial disorders such as cancer. Determining tumor allelotypes increases the understanding of the underlying tumorigenesis and improves the prognosis in tumor patients.
