= Stefanie Martin =

German biological anthropologist

Stefanie Martin, born Stefanie Oppenheim (10 July 1877 – 24 September 1954) was a German biological anthropologist.

== Life ==
Stephanie L. Oppenheim was born to a Jewish family in Frankfurt on 10 July 1877.

Oppenheim married the Swiss anthropogist Rudolf Martin, becoming his second wife. After his death in 1925, she edited a revised edition (1928) of his textbook of physical anthropology.

In 1930 she was a contributor to Walter Scheidt's Rockefeller-funded anthropological study of the German population.

Facing Nazi persecution, she was sent to Theresienstadt. Some sources wrongfully give her year of death as 1940. She certainly survived Theresienstadt and later moved back to Germany where she died in Lautrach on 24 September 1954.

== Works ==
- Zur Typologie des Primatencraniums. Stuttgart: E. Schweizerbart, 1911.
- (ed.) Lehrbuch der Anthropologie in systematischer Darstellung [Textbook of Physical Anthropology in Systematic Presentation] by Rudolf Martin. 1928.
