= Sodium/potassium/calcium exchanger 4 =

Protein-coding gene in the species Homo sapiens

SLC24A4

Identifiers
- Aliases: SLC24A4, AI2A5, NCKX4, SHEP6, SLC24A2, solute carrier family 24 member 4
- External IDs: OMIM: 609840; MGI: 2447362; GeneCards: SLC24A4

Gene location (Human)
Chr.	Chromosome 14 (human)
Band	14q32.12	Start	92,322,581 bp
Band	14q32.12	End	92,501,481 bp
RNA expression pattern
Bgee	Human / Mouse (ortholog); Top expressed in: monocyte; primary visual cortex; middle temporal gyrus; sural nerve; Brodmann area 23; blood; granulocyte; buccal mucosa cell; gonad; pons / n/a; More reference expression data
BioGPS	n/a
Gene ontology
Molecular function	calcium channel activity; sodium ion binding; calcium ion binding; potassium ion binding; symporter activity; antiporter activity; calcium, potassium:sodium antiporter activity
Cellular component	integral component of membrane; membrane; integral component of plasma membrane; plasma membrane; cytoplasm
Biological process	calcium ion transport; sensory perception of smell; sodium ion transport; sodium ion transmembrane transport; calcium ion transmembrane transport; amelogenesis; response to stimulus; ion transport; cellular calcium ion homeostasis; potassium ion transport; transmembrane transport; potassium ion transmembrane transport; anion transmembrane transport
Sources:Amigo / QuickGO
Orthologs
Databases	NCBI: entry; OMA: entry
Species	Human	Mouse
Entrez	123041	238384
Ensembl	ENSG00000140090	ENSMUSG00000041771
UniProt	Q8NFF2	Q8CGQ8
RefSeq (mRNA)	NM_153646; NM_153647; NM_153648; NM_001378620	NM_172152; NM_001362345
RefSeq (protein)	NP_705932; NP_705933; NP_705934; NP_001365549	NP_742164; NP_001349274
Location (UCSC)	Chr 14: 92.32 – 92.5 Mb	n/a
PubMed search
- Wikidata
View/Edit Human	View/Edit Mouse

Sodium/potassium/calcium exchanger 4 also known as solute carrier family 24 member 4 is a protein that in humans is encoded by the SLC24A4 gene.

== Clinical effects ==
Mutations in SLC24A4 cause amelogenesis imperfecta.
