= FBXL5 =

Protein-coding gene in the species Homo sapiens

Identifiers
- Aliases: FBXL5, FBL4, FBL5, FLR1, F-box and leucine-rich repeat protein 5, F-box and leucine rich repeat protein 5
- External IDs: OMIM: 605655; MGI: 2152883; GeneCards: FBXL5
Available structures
PDB	Ortholog search: PDBe RCSB
PDB	List of PDB id codes 3U9J, 3U9M, 3V5X, 3V5Y, 3V5Z

Gene location (Human)
Chr.	Chromosome 4 (human)
Band	4p15.32	Start	15,604,381 bp
Band	4p15.32	End	15,681,679 bp

Gene location (Mouse)
Chr.	Chromosome 5 (mouse)
Band	5|5 B3	Start	43,901,957 bp
Band	5|5 B3	End	43,978,980 bp
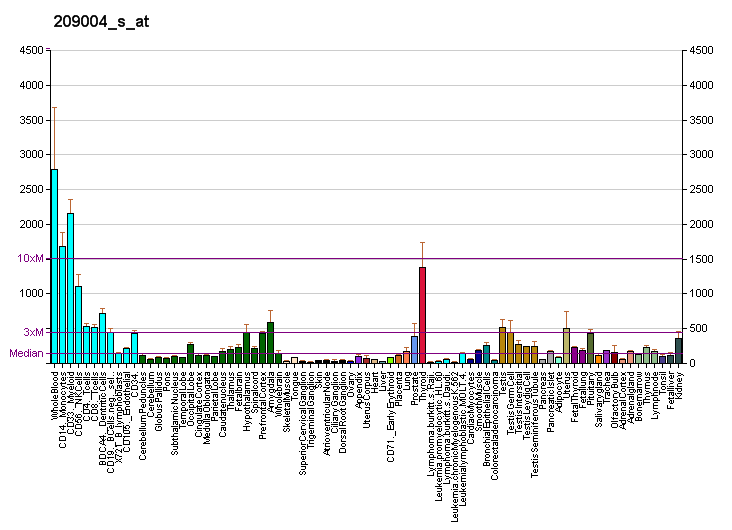

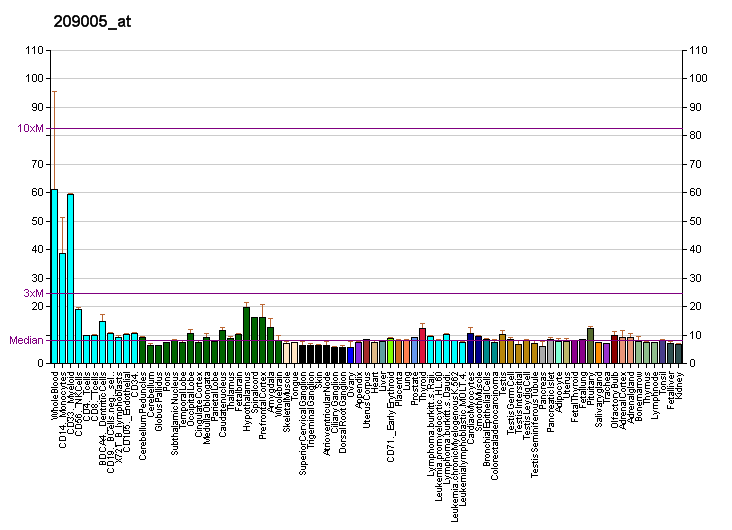
RNA expression pattern
Bgee	Human / Mouse (ortholog); Top expressed in: monocyte; Epithelium of choroid plexus; Achilles tendon; kidney tubule; blood; seminal vesicula; germinal epithelium; oocyte; secondary oocyte; sperm / Top expressed in: spermatocyte; granulocyte; otolith organ; utricle; spermatid; neural layer of retina; lobe of cerebellum; gastrula; cerebellar vermis; habenula; More reference expression data
BioGPS	More reference expression data
Gene ontology
Molecular function	iron ion binding; protein binding; metal ion binding; ubiquitin-protein transferase activity
Cellular component	ubiquitin ligase complex; cytoplasm; SCF ubiquitin ligase complex; perinuclear region of cytoplasm; cytosol
Biological process	SCF-dependent proteasomal ubiquitin-dependent protein catabolic process; protein ubiquitination; iron ion homeostasis; protein polyubiquitination; cellular iron ion homeostasis; post-translational protein modification; ubiquitin-dependent protein catabolic process
Sources:Amigo / QuickGO
Orthologs
Databases	NCBI: entry; OMA: entry
Species	Human	Mouse
Entrez	26234	242960
Ensembl	ENSG00000118564	ENSMUSG00000039753
UniProt	Q9UKA1	Q8C2S5
RefSeq (mRNA)	NM_001193534; NM_001193535; NM_012161	NM_001159963; NM_178729
RefSeq (protein)	NP_001180463; NP_001180464; NP_036293	NP_001153435; NP_848844
Location (UCSC)	Chr 4: 15.6 – 15.68 Mb	Chr 5: 43.9 – 43.98 Mb
PubMed search
- Wikidata
View/Edit Human	View/Edit Mouse

F-box/LRR-repeat protein 5 is a protein that in humans is encoded by the FBXL5 gene.

This gene encodes a member of the F-box protein family which is characterized by an approximately 40 amino acid motif, the F-box. The F-box proteins constitute one of the four subunits of ubiquitin protein ligase complex called SCFs (SKP1-cullin-F-box), which function in phosphorylation-dependent ubiquitination. The F-box proteins are divided into 3 classes: Fbws containing WD-40 domains, Fbls containing leucine-rich repeats, and Fbxs containing either different protein-protein interaction modules or no recognizable motifs. The protein encoded by this gene belongs to the Fbls class and, in addition to an F-box, contains several tandem leucine-rich repeats. Alternative splicing of this gene generates 2 transcript variants.

FBXL5 is an iron and oxygen sensor. It promotes IRP2 ubiquitination and then its degradation in an iron- and oxygen-dependent manner. The cryo-EM structure of the FBXL5-IRP2 complex revealed an unexpected 2Fe2S cluster embedded in the leucine-rich repeats domain of the F-box protein in close vicinity of the protein-protein interaction interface. FBXL5, therefore, is an iron-sulfur protein. FBXL5 can only engage IRP2 when its 2Fe2S cluster is in the oxidized state, which explains how oxygen tension dictates IRP2 stability.
