= USP20 =

Protein-coding gene in the species Homo sapiens

Identifiers
- Aliases: USP20, LSFR3A, VDU2, hVDU2, ubiquitin specific peptidase 20
- External IDs: OMIM: 615143; MGI: 1921520; GeneCards: USP20
Enzyme activity
EC #	BRENDA	ExPASy	KEGG	MetaCyc
3.4.19.12	↗	↗	↗	↗

Gene location (Human)
Chr.	Chromosome 9 (human)
Band	9q34.11	Start	129,834,698 bp
Band	9q34.11	End	129,881,828 bp

Gene location (Mouse)
Chr.	Chromosome 2 (mouse)
Band	2|2 B	Start	30,872,291 bp
Band	2|2 B	End	30,913,598 bp
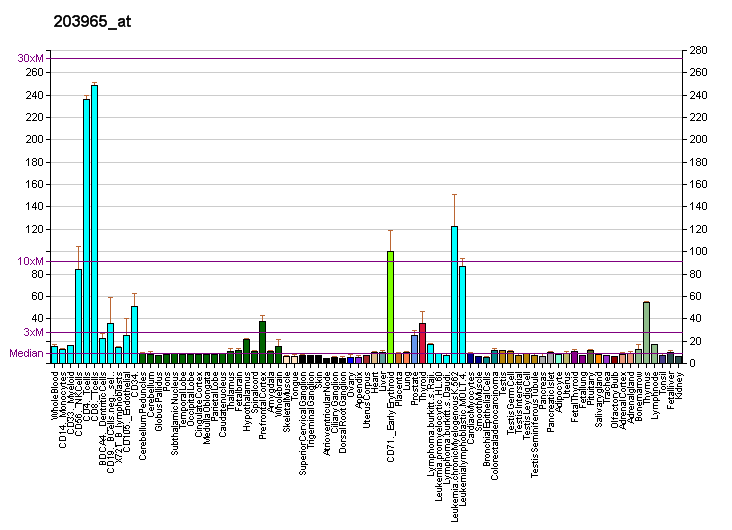
RNA expression pattern
Bgee	Human / Mouse (ortholog); Top expressed in: granulocyte; anterior pituitary; right lobe of thyroid gland; right hemisphere of cerebellum; left lobe of thyroid gland; right frontal lobe; ascending aorta; gastric mucosa; muscle layer of sigmoid colon; Descending thoracic aorta / Top expressed in: spermatid; lumbar spinal ganglion; spermatocyte; habenula; dentate gyrus of hippocampal formation granule cell; dorsomedial hypothalamic nucleus; subiculum; right kidney; paraventricular nucleus of hypothalamus; dorsal tegmental nucleus; More reference expression data
BioGPS	More reference expression data
Gene ontology
Molecular function	cysteine-type peptidase activity; zinc ion binding; metal ion binding; peptidase activity; protein binding; thiol-dependent deubiquitinase; cysteine-type endopeptidase activity; hydrolase activity; G protein-coupled receptor binding
Cellular component	cytoplasm; centrosome; microtubule organizing center; perinuclear region of cytoplasm; cytoskeleton; cytosol
Biological process	endocytosis; protein K48-linked deubiquitination; ubiquitin-dependent protein catabolic process; regulation of G protein-coupled receptor signaling pathway; proteolysis; protein K63-linked deubiquitination; protein deubiquitination
Sources:Amigo / QuickGO
Orthologs
Databases	NCBI: entry; OMA: entry
Species	Human	Mouse
Entrez	10868	74270
Ensembl	ENSG00000136878	ENSMUSG00000026854
UniProt	Q9Y2K6	Q8C6M1
RefSeq (mRNA)	NM_001008563; NM_001110303; NM_006676	NM_028846
RefSeq (protein)	NP_001008563; NP_001103773; NP_006667	NP_083122
Location (UCSC)	Chr 9: 129.83 – 129.88 Mb	Chr 2: 30.87 – 30.91 Mb
PubMed search
- Wikidata
View/Edit Human	View/Edit Mouse

Ubiquitin carboxyl-terminal hydrolase 20 is an enzyme that in humans is encoded by the USP20 gene.

Ubiquitin-specific protease 20 (USP20), also known as ubiquitin-binding protein 20 and VHL protein-interacting deubiquitinating enzyme 2 (VDU2), is a cysteine protease deubiquitinating enzyme (DUB). The catalytic site of USP20, like other DUBs, contains conserved cysteine and histidine residues that catalyse the proteolysis of an isopeptide bond between a lysine residue of a target protein and a glycine residue of a ubiquitin molecule. USP20 is known to deubiquitinate a number of proteins including thyronine deiodinase type 2 (D2), Hypoxia-inducible factor 1α (HIF1α), and β_{2} adrenergic receptor (β_{2}AR).

== Gene ==
The USP20 gene is located on chromosome 9 at the locus 9q34.11.

== Structure ==
USP20 is a 914-amino acid protein that shows 59% homology with another DUB, USP33. It contains 4 known domains, an N-terminal Zf UBP domain, a catalytic domain containing conserved histidine and cysteine residues, and two C-terminal DUSP domains.

== Function ==
DUBs are categorised into 5 main groups, ubiquitin-specific proteases (USP), ubiquitin c-terminal hydrolases (UCH), ovarian tumour proteases (OTU), Machado-Joseph disease proteases (MJD), and JAB1/MPN/MOV34 proteases (JAMM/MPN+). The first four groups are cysteine proteases, whereas the last group are Zn metalloproteases. USP20 belongs to the USP group and, like most DUBs, catalyse the breakage of an isopeptide bond between a lysine residue of the target protein and the terminal glycine residue of a ubiquitin protein. This occurs via a conserved cysteine and histidine residue in the catalytic site of the enzyme. The histidine molecule is protonated by the cysteine residue and this allows the cystein residue to undergo a nucleophilic attack on the isopeptide bond, which removes the ubiquitin from the substrate protein.

=== Thyronine deiodinase type 2 ===
USP20 deubiquitinates thyronine deiodinase type 2 (D2), an enzyme that converts thyroxine (T4) into active 3,5,3'-triiodothyronine (T3). D2 is ubiquitinated after binding of T4, which signals for the degradation of D2 via the proteasome and also causes an inactivating conformational change of the protein. Deubiquitination by USP20 rescues D2 from degradation and also returns D2 to its active conformation.

=== Hypoxia inducible factor 1α ===
The von Hippel-Lindau tumour suppressor protein (pVHL) ubiquitinates hypoxia-inducible factor 1α (HIF1α) when cell oxygen levels are normal. This leads to the degradation of HIF1α and prevents the transcription of hypoxic response genes such as vascular endothelial growth factor, platelet-derived growth factor B, and erythropoietin. USP20 deubiquitinates HIF1α, preventing its proteasomal degradation, and allows it to transcribe the hypoxic response genes.

=== β_{2} adrenergic receptor ===
USP20 is involved in the recycling of the β_{2}-adrenergic receptor. After agonist stimulation, the receptor is internalised and ubiquitinated. USP20 serves to deubiquitinate the receptor and prevent its degradation by the proteasome. This allows it to be recycled to the cell surface in order to resensitize the cell to signalling molecules.

== Regulation ==
In addition to the regulation of HIF1α, pVHL regulates USP20. USP20 binds to the β-domain of pVHL and is subsequently ubiquitinated. This signals USP20 for degradation via the proteasome.
