= F-box protein =

Protein containing at least one F-box domain

F-box linker domain
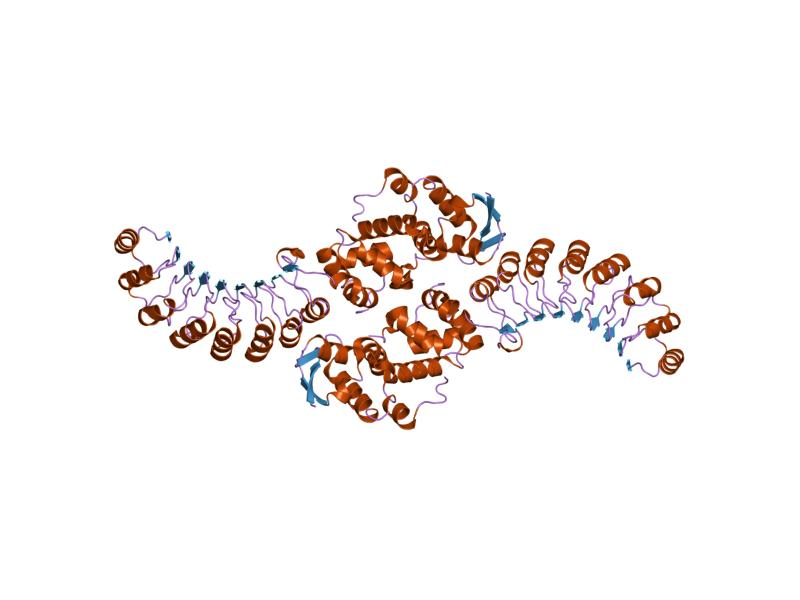
- Structure of the LRR linker domain of Skp2 in the Skp1-Skp2 complex.

Identifiers
- Symbol: F-box
- Pfam: PF00646
- Pfam clan: CL0271
- InterPro: IPR001810
- SMART: SM00256
- PROSITE: PS50181
- SCOP2: 1fs2 / SCOPe / SUPFAM
- Membranome: 630
Available protein structures:
- PDB: IPR001810 PF00646 (ECOD; PDBsum)
- AlphaFold: IPR001810; PF00646

F-box proteins, sometimes abbreviated as FBX, are proteins containing at least one F-box domain. The first identified F-box protein is one of three components of the SCF complex, which mediates ubiquitination of proteins targeted for degradation by the 26S proteasome.

== Core components ==
F-box domain is a protein structural motif of about 50 amino acids that mediates protein–protein interactions. It has consensus sequence and varies in few positions. It was first identified in cyclin F. The F-box motif of Skp2, consisting of three alpha-helices, interacts directly with the SCF protein Skp1. F-box domains commonly exist in proteins in cancer with other protein–protein interaction motifs such as leucine-rich repeats (illustrated in the Figure) and WD repeats, which are thought to mediate interactions with SCF substrates.

== Function ==
F-box proteins have also been associated with cellular functions such as signal transduction and regulation of the cell cycle. In plants, many F-box proteins are represented in gene networks broadly regulated by microRNA-mediated gene silencing via RNA interference. F-box proteins are involved in many plant vegetative and reproduction growth and development. For example, F-box protein-FOA1 involved in abscisic acid (ABA) signaling to affect the seed germination. ACRE189/ACIF1 can regulate cell death and defense when the pathogen is recognized in the Tobacco and Tomato plant.

In human cells, under high-iron conditions, two iron atoms stabilise the F-Box FBXL5 and then the complex mediates the ubiquitination of IRP2.

== Regulation ==
F-box protein levels can be regulated by different mechanisms. The regulation can occur via protein degradation process and association with SCF complex . For example, in yeast, the F-box protein Met30 can be ubiquitinated in a cullin-dependent manner.
