= Rudolf Martin (anthropologist) =

German physical anthropologist

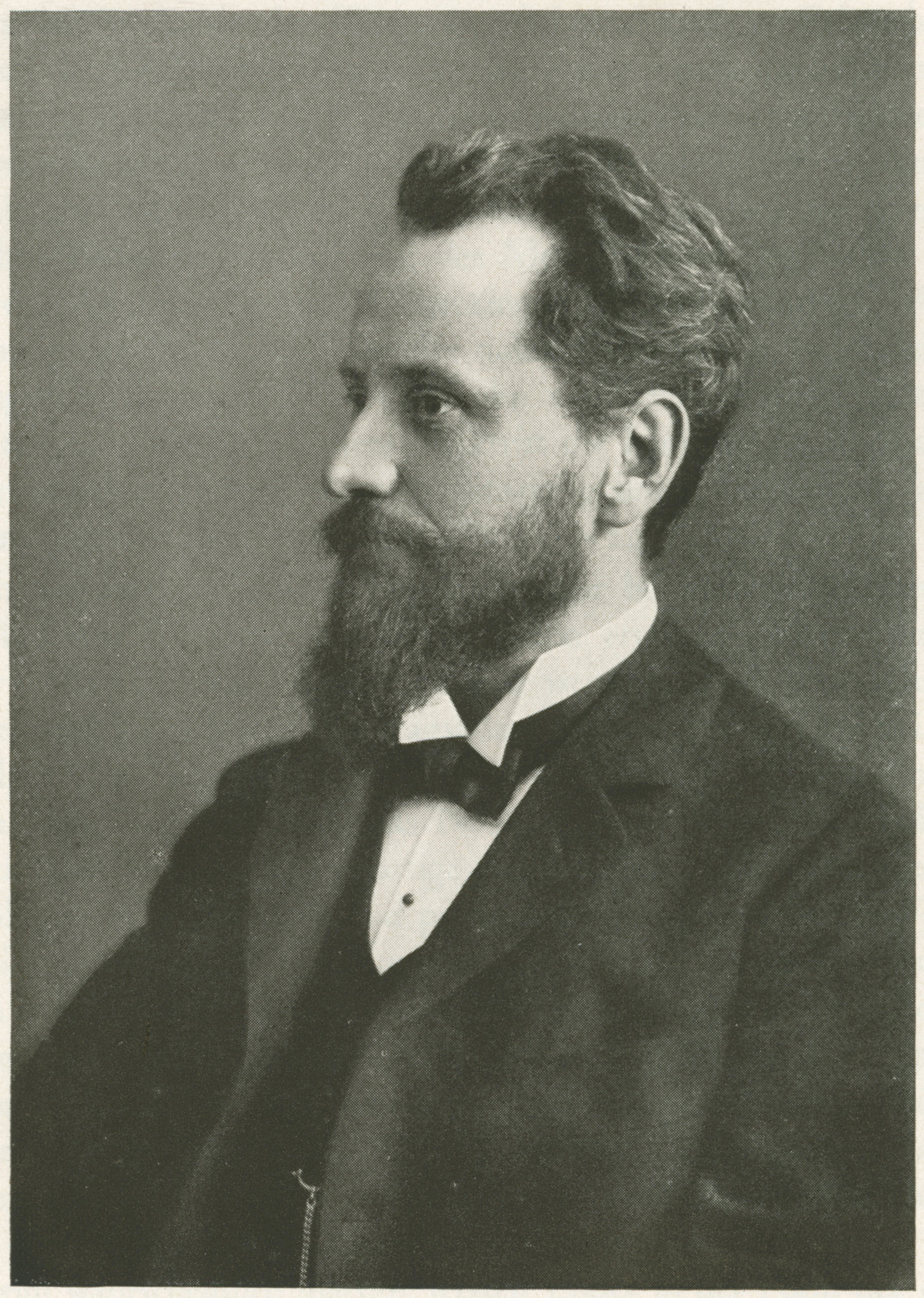
Rudolf Martin 1864–1925

Rudolf Martin (1 July 1864 – 11 July 1925) was a Swiss anthropologist, specializing in physical anthropology. Martin's second wife, Stefanie Oppenheim, survived him and edited a second (1928) edition of his physical anthropology textbook.

== Rudolf Martin's Historical Archive ==
Rudolf Martin was a professor of Physical Anthropology in Munich, who had become inspired by the discovery of the "Java Man" (Pithecanthropus erectus) in 1893 in Java, by the Dutch anthropologist Eugène Dubois. Dubois' publications on the 'Missing Link' became the center point of Martin's archive, comprising more than 43,000 historical documents, manuscripts, scientific books, and journals.

The Archive had been safeguarded in 1940 from Germany just before WW II. It went to the Institute of Physical Anthropology of Utrecht University until the institute was discontinued in 1993. After rescuing it from destruction, Slikkerveer became the owner of the oldest palaeo-anthropological archive in the world. After many years of research within the Leiden Ethnosystems and Development Programme (LEAD), he donated the archive on 23 January 2020 to the Naturalis Biodiversity Center in Leiden.

== Sources ==
- Oetteking, Bruno (April–June 1926). "Rudolf Martin". American Anthropologist. 28 (2): 414–417. doi:10.1525/aa.1926.28.2.02a00070. JSTOR 661556. Obituary.
- Schadewaldt, H. (2008). "Martin, Rudolf". Complete Dictionary of Scientific Biography. Detroit: Charles Scribner's Sons. ISBN 9780684315591. OCLC 187313311 – via Encyclopedia.com).
