= DCUN1D1 =

Protein-coding gene in the species Homo sapiens

Available structures
PDB	Ortholog search: PDBe RCSB
PDB	List of PDB id codes 3TDU, 3TDZ, 4P5O

Identifiers
- Aliases: DCUN1D1, DCNL1, DCUN1L1, RP42, SCCRO, SCRO, Tes3, defective in cullin neddylation 1 domain containing 1
- External IDs: OMIM: 605905; MGI: 2150386; HomoloGene: 10773; GeneCards: DCUN1D1; OMA:DCUN1D1 - orthologs

Gene location (Human)
Chr.	Chromosome 3 (human)
Band	3q26.33	Start	182,938,074 bp
Band	3q26.33	End	182,985,953 bp

Gene location (Mouse)
Chr.	Chromosome 3 (mouse)
Band	3|3 B	Start	35,946,254 bp
Band	3|3 B	End	35,991,594 bp
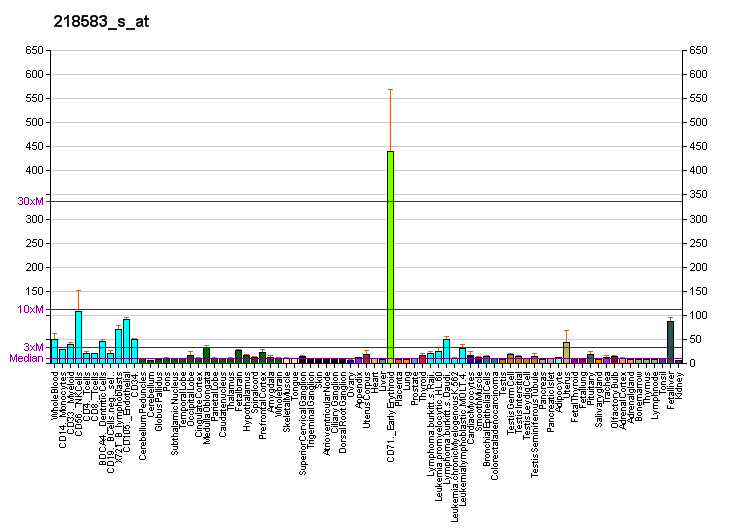
RNA expression pattern
Bgee	Human / Mouse (ortholog); Top expressed in: left testis; right testis; sperm; endothelial cell; tendon of biceps brachii; trabecular bone; buccal mucosa cell; Achilles tendon; tail of epididymis; middle temporal gyrus / Top expressed in: zygote; spermatid; Rostral migratory stream; secondary oocyte; genital tubercle; spermatocyte; interventricular septum; Paneth cell; triceps brachii muscle; vastus lateralis muscle; More reference expression data
BioGPS	More reference expression data
Gene ontology
Molecular function	cullin family protein binding; ubiquitin-like protein binding; protein binding; ubiquitin conjugating enzyme binding
Cellular component	ubiquitin ligase complex; nucleus; cytosol
Biological process	protein neddylation; positive regulation of ubiquitin-protein transferase activity; post-translational protein modification; positive regulation of protein neddylation
Sources:Amigo / QuickGO
Orthologs
Species	Human	Mouse
Entrez	54165	114893
Ensembl	ENSG00000043093	ENSMUSG00000027708
UniProt	Q96GG9	Q9QZ73
RefSeq (mRNA)	NM_001308101; NM_020640	NM_001205361; NM_001205362; NM_033623
RefSeq (protein)	NP_001295030; NP_065691	NP_001192290; NP_001192291; NP_296372
Location (UCSC)	Chr 3: 182.94 – 182.99 Mb	Chr 3: 35.95 – 35.99 Mb
PubMed search
- Wikidata
View/Edit Human	View/Edit Mouse

DCN1-like protein 1 is a protein that in humans is encoded by the DCUN1D1 gene.

DCUN1D1 is amplified in several cancer types, including squamous cell cancers, and may act as an oncogenic driver in cancer cells.

== Interactions ==
DCUN1D1 has been shown to interact with:

- CAND1,
- CUL1,
- CUL2,
- CUL3 and
- RBX1.
