= CCDC8 =

Protein-coding gene in humans

Identifiers
- Aliases: CCDC8, 3M3, PPP1R20, p90, coiled-coil domain containing 8
- External IDs: OMIM: 614145; MGI: 3612184; GeneCards: CCDC8
Available structures
| PDB | Ortholog search: PDBe RCSB |
| PDB | List of PDB id codes 4LG6 |

Gene location (Human)
| Chr. | Chromosome 19 (human) |
| Band | 19q13.32 | Start | 46,410,329 bp |
| Band | 19q13.32 | End | 46,413,564 bp |

Gene location (Mouse)
| Chr. | Chromosome 7 (mouse) |
| Band | 7|7 A2 | Start | 16,726,633 bp |
| Band | 7|7 A2 | End | 16,731,441 bp |
RNA expression pattern
| Bgee | Human / Mouse (ortholog); Top expressed in: cardiac muscle tissue of right atrium; myocardium of left ventricle; vena cava; right ventricle; saphenous vein; renal medulla; right uterine tube; cardia; tibia; trachea / Top expressed in: interventricular septum; hand; Gonadal ridge; atrium; cumulus cell; mandibular prominence; left lung lobe; ventricular zone; vas deferens; endocardial cushion; More reference expression data |
| BioGPS | n/a |
Gene ontology
| Molecular function | protein binding |
| Cellular component | microtubule organizing center; plasma membrane; 3M complex; cytoskeleton; cytoplasm; centrosome; nucleus; cytosol |
| Biological process | regulation of mitotic nuclear division; negative regulation of phosphatase activity; microtubule cytoskeleton organization; post-translational protein modification |
Sources:Amigo / QuickGO
Orthologs
| Databases | NCBI: entry; OMA: entry |
| Species | Human | Mouse |
| Entrez | 83987 | 434130 |
| Ensembl | ENSG00000169515 | ENSMUSG00000041117 |
| UniProt | Q9H0W5 | D3YZV8 |
| RefSeq (mRNA) | NM_032040 | NM_001101535 |
| RefSeq (protein) | NP_114429 | NP_001095005 |
| Location (UCSC) | Chr 19: 46.41 – 46.41 Mb | Chr 7: 16.73 – 16.73 Mb |
| PubMed search |
- Wikidata
| View/Edit Human | View/Edit Mouse |

Coiled-coil domain containing 8 is a protein that in humans is encoded by the CCDC8 gene.

== Function ==
This gene encodes a coiled coil domain-containing protein. The encoded protein functions as a cofactor required for p53-mediated apoptosis following DNA damage, and may also play a role in growth through interactions with the cytoskeletal adaptor protein obscurin-like 1.

== Clinical relevance ==
Mutations in this gene have been shown to cause 3-M syndrome.
