= F-box protein 16 =

Protein-coding gene in the species Homo sapiens

FBXO16

Identifiers
- Aliases: FBXO16, FBX16, F-box protein 16
- External IDs: OMIM: 608519; MGI: 1354706; GeneCards: FBXO16

Gene location (Human)
Chr.	Chromosome 8 (human)
Band	8p21.1	Start	28,348,287 bp
Band	8p21.1	End	28,490,278 bp

Gene location (Mouse)
Chr.	Chromosome 14 (mouse)
Band	14|14 D1	Start	65,504,067 bp
Band	14|14 D1	End	65,561,422 bp
RNA expression pattern
Bgee	Human / Mouse (ortholog); Top expressed in: anterior pituitary; testicle; Brodmann area 9; right hemisphere of cerebellum; nucleus accumbens; right frontal lobe; islet of Langerhans; gonad; prefrontal cortex; right uterine tube / Top expressed in: zygote; tail of embryo; olfactory epithelium; morula; embryo; neural tube; genital tubercle; ganglionic eminence; embryo; ventricular zone; More reference expression data
BioGPS	n/a
Orthologs
Databases	NCBI: entry; OMA: entry
Species	Human	Mouse
Entrez	157574	50759
Ensembl	ENSG00000214050	ENSMUSG00000034532
UniProt	Q8IX29	Q9QZM9
RefSeq (mRNA)	NM_172366; NM_001258211	NM_015795; NM_001360381; NM_001360383
RefSeq (protein)	NP_001245140; NP_758954	NP_056610; NP_001347310; NP_001347312
Location (UCSC)	Chr 8: 28.35 – 28.49 Mb	Chr 14: 65.5 – 65.56 Mb
PubMed search
- Wikidata
View/Edit Human	View/Edit Mouse

F-box protein 16 is a protein that in humans is encoded by the FBXO16 gene.

== Function ==
This gene encodes a member of the F-box protein family, members of which are characterized by an approximately 40 amino acid motif, the F-box. The F-box proteins constitute one of the four subunits of ubiquitin protein ligase complex called SCFs (SKP1-cullin-F-box), which function in phosphorylation-dependent ubiquitination. The F-box proteins are divided into three classes: Fbws containing WD-40 domains, Fbls containing leucine-rich repeats, and Fbxs containing either different protein-protein interaction modules or no recognizable motifs. The protein encoded by this gene belongs to the Fbx class. Multiple transcript variants encoding different isoforms have been found for this gene.
