= Cullin =

Hydrophobic scaffold protein

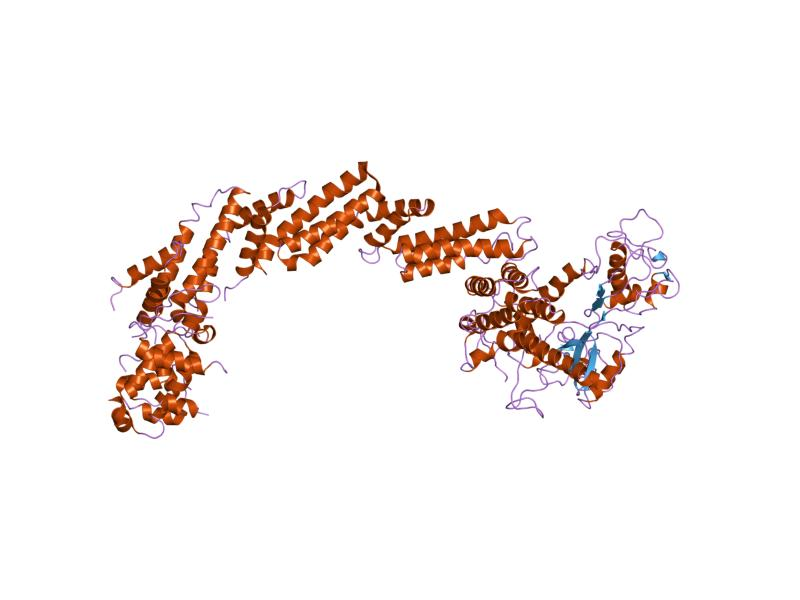
- structure of the cul1-rbx1-skp1-f boxskp2 scf ubiquitin ligase complex

Identifiers
- Symbol: Cullin
- Pfam: PF00888
- InterPro: IPR001373
- PROSITE: PDOC00967
- SCOP2: 1ldj / SCOPe / SUPFAM
Available protein structures:
- PDB: IPR001373 PF00888 (ECOD; PDBsum)
- AlphaFold: IPR001373; PF00888

Cullin protein neddylation domain
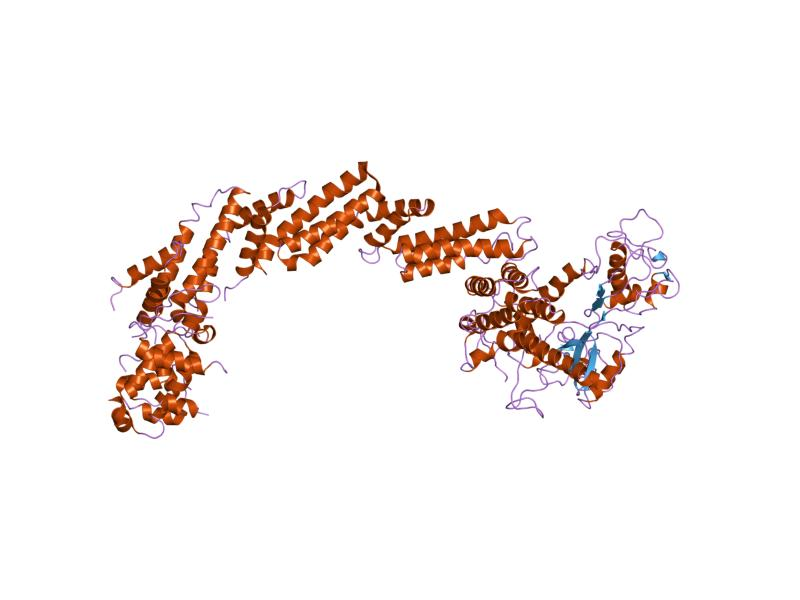
- structure of the cul1-rbx1-skp1-f boxskp2 scf ubiquitin ligase complex

Identifiers
- Symbol: Cullin_Nedd8
- Pfam: PF10557
- InterPro: IPR019559
Available protein structures:
- PDB: IPR019559 PF10557 (ECOD; PDBsum)
- AlphaFold: IPR019559; PF10557

Cullins are a family of hydrophobic scaffold proteins which provide support for ubiquitin ligases (E3). All eukaryotes appear to have cullins. They combine with RING proteins to form Cullin-RING ubiquitin ligases (CRLs) that are highly diverse and play a role in myriad cellular processes, most notably protein degradation by ubiquitination.

The human genome contains eight cullin genes

- CUL1, part of SCF complex
- CUL2, part of ECS complex (Elongin C - CUL2 - SOCS-box)
- CUL3, part of CUL3-BTB complex
- CUL4A
- CUL4B
- CUL5
- CUL7
- CUL9, also known as PARC

There is also a more distant member called ANAPC2 (or APC2), part of the Anaphase-promoting complex.

CUL1, 2, 3, 4A, 4B, 5 and 7 each form part of a multi-subunit ubiquitin complex.

== Cullin-RING ubiquitin ligases ==
Cullin-RING ubiquitin ligases (CRLs), such as Cul1 (SCF) play an essential role in targeting proteins for ubiquitin-mediated destruction; as such, they are diverse in terms of composition and function, regulating many different processes from glucose sensing and DNA replication to limb patterning and circadian rhythms. The catalytic core of CRLs consists of a RING protein and a cullin family member. For Cul1, the C-terminal cullin-homology domain binds the RING protein. The RING protein appears to function as a docking site for ubiquitin-conjugating enzymes (E2s). Other proteins contain a cullin-homology domain, such as CUL9, also known as p53 cytoplasmic anchor PARC, and the ANAPC2 subunit of the anaphase-promoting complex/cyclosome; both CUL9 and ANAPC2 have ubiquitin ligase activity. The N-terminal region of cullins is more variable, and is used to interact with specific adaptor proteins.

== Modification by NEDD8 ==
With the exception of ANAPC2, each member of the cullin family is modified by Nedd8 and several cullins function in Ubiquitin-dependent proteolysis, a process in which the 26S proteasome recognises and subsequently degrades a target protein tagged with K48-linked poly-ubiquitin chains. Nedd8/Rub1 is a small ubiquitin-like protein, which was originally found to be conjugated to Cdc53, a cullin component of the SCF (Skp1-Cdc53/CUL1-F-box protein) E3 Ub ligase complex in Saccharomyces cerevisiae (Baker's yeast), and Nedd8 modification has now emerged as a regulatory pathway of fundamental importance for cell cycle control and for embryogenesis in metazoans. The only identified Nedd8 substrates are cullins. Neddylation results in covalent conjugation of a Nedd8 moiety onto a conserved cullin lysine residue.
