= C16orf95 =

Protein-coding gene in the species Homo sapiens

Identifiers
- Aliases: C16orf95, chromosome 16 open reading frame 95
- External IDs: MGI: 1923655; GeneCards: C16orf95

Gene location (Human)
Chr.	Chromosome 16 (human)
Band	16q24.2	Start	87,083,562 bp
Band	16q24.2	End	87,317,420 bp

Gene location (Mouse)
Chr.	Chromosome 8 (mouse)
Band	8|8 E1	Start	122,257,519 bp
Band	8|8 E1	End	122,271,059 bp
RNA expression pattern
Bgee	Human / Mouse (ortholog); Top expressed in: left testis; right testis; right lobe of liver; gonad; muscle of thigh; mucosa of transverse colon; testicle; right adrenal cortex; gastrocnemius muscle; prefrontal cortex / Top expressed in: spermatid; seminiferous tubule; spermatocyte; zygote; secondary oocyte; embryo; primary oocyte; embryo; blastocyst; spleen; More reference expression data
BioGPS	n/a
Orthologs
Databases	NCBI: entry; OMA: entry
Species	Human	Mouse
Entrez	100506581	76405
Ensembl	ENSG00000260456	ENSMUSG00000031809
UniProt	Q9H693	n/a
RefSeq (mRNA)	NM_001256917; NM_001195124; NM_001195125	NM_029597; NM_001357259; NM_001357260; NM_001382230; NM_001382231 NM_001382232; NM_001382233
RefSeq (protein)	NP_001182053; NP_001182054; NP_001243846	n/a
Location (UCSC)	Chr 16: 87.08 – 87.32 Mb	Chr 8: 122.26 – 122.27 Mb
PubMed search
- Wikidata
View/Edit Human	View/Edit Mouse

Chromosome 16 open reading frame 95 is a protein that in humans is encoded by the C16orf95 gene. It has orthologs in mammals, and is expressed at a low level in many tissues. C16orf95 evolves quickly compared to other proteins.

== Gene ==
C16orf95 is a Homo sapiens gene oriented on the minus strand of chromosome 16. It is located on the cytogenic band 16q24.2 and spans 14.62 kilobases. The gene contains 6 introns and 7 exons.

Diagram showing the location of C16orf95 on chromosome 16. Image retrieved from the GeneCards entry on C16orf95.

== Homology ==
=== Paralogs ===
There are no known paralogs of C16orf95.

=== Orthologs ===
Orthologs of C16orf95 exist only in mammals (identified with BLAST). The most distant orthologs are found in opossums and Tasmanian devils.

Genus and species	Common name	NCBI accession	Date of divergence	Sequence identity
Homo sapiens	Human	NP_001182053	0 mya	100%
Pan paniscus	Bonobo	XP_008972565	6.2 mya	92%
Gorilla gorilla gorilla	Gorilla	XP_004058157	8.3 mya	95%
Nomascus leucogenys	White-cheeked gibbon	XP_003272503	19.3 mya	88%
Mandrillus leucophaeus	Drill	XP_011827052	27.3 mya	78%
Propithecus coquereli	Lemur	XP_012513111	77.1 mya	62%
Tupaia chinensis	Tree shrew	XP_006152612	86.5 mya	58%
Oryctolagus cuniculus	European rabbit	XP_008250325	90.1 mya	56%
Mus musculus	Mouse	NP_083873	90.1 mya	54%
Rattus norvegicus	Rat	XP_006222844	90.1 mya	51%
Camelus bactrianus	Camel	XP_010966555	95 mya	63%
Canis lupus familiaris	Dog	XP_005620646	95 mya	63%
Equus caballus	Horse	XP_005608538	95 mya	60%
Felis catus	Cat	XP_011288582	95 mya	60%
Bos taurus	Cattle	XP_015331266	95 mya	60%
Lipotes vexillifer	Yangtze river dolphin	XP_007468528	95 mya	50%
Myotis lucifugus	Brown bat	XP_014318589	95 mya	56%
Trichechus manatus latirostris	Manatee	XP_004377854	102 mya	66%
Loxodonta africana	Elephant	XP_003418190	102 mya	59%
Orycteropus afer afer	Aardvark	XP_007937409	102 mya	54%
Monodelphis domestica	Opossum	XP_007477328	162.4 mya	42%
Sarcophilus harrisii	Tasmanian devil	XP_012395810	162.4 mya	41%

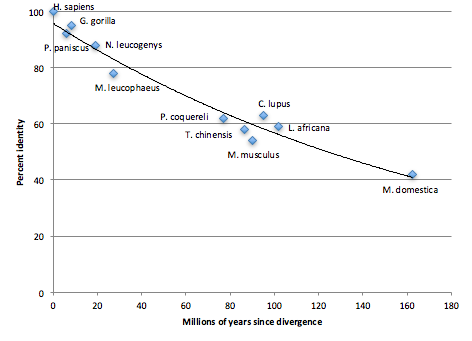
The percent identity of several sequences to the human C16orf95 protein were graphed with respect to approximate time of divergence. Data points are labeled with the appropriate species name. Median dates of divergence were found using TimeTree.

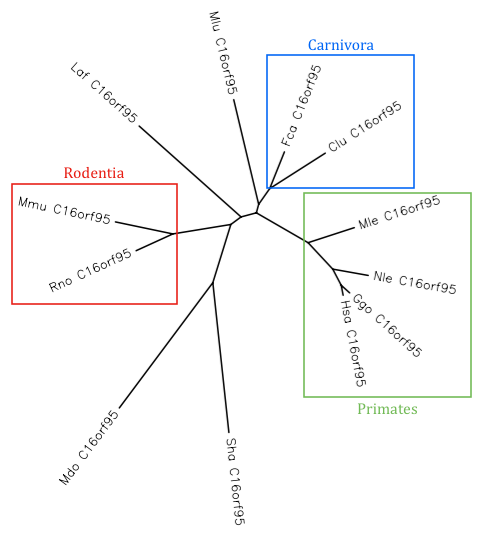
A time-calibrated phylogenetic tree showing the evolutionary relationships among a subset of orthologs. The primates, rodents, and carnivores are grouped together based on the similarity of their protein sequences. The unrooted tree was made using the ClustalW application in SDSC Biology Workbench.

== mRNA ==
=== Alternative splicing ===
There are three splice variants of C16orf95. The longest transcript contains 1156 base pairs and 7 exons. Compared to variant 1, the second transcript variant lacks exons 4 and 5. This alternative splicing results in a frameshift of the 3' coding region, and a shorter, unique C-terminus. The third transcript variant lacks exons 4 and 5, and uses an alternate 5' exon and start codon. The resulting peptide has unique N- and C-termini compared to variant 1.

	Size (base pairs)		
Exon #	Variant 1	Variant 2	Variant 3
1	330	330	334
2	52	52	52
3	126	126	126
4	147	–	–
5	37	–	–
6	187	187	187
7	277	278	278
Total	1,156	973	977

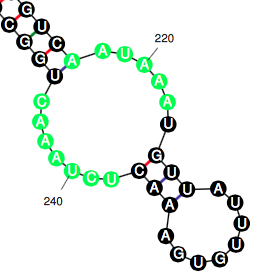
The binding sites for KHDRBS3 in the 3' untranslated region (UTR) are highlighted in green. Secondary structure was predicted with the mfold Web Server, and likely sites for RNA-binding proteins were found with RBPDB.

=== Secondary structure ===
The 3' untranslated region of the C16orf95 mRNA contains binding sites for KH domain-containing, RNA-binding, signal transduction-associated protein 3 (KHDRBS3) within an internal loop structure. KHDRBS3 regulates mRNA splicing and may act as a negative regulator of cell growth.

== Expression ==
The expression of C16orf95 is not well characterized. However, it has been detected at low levels in the following tissue types: bone, brain, ear, eye, intestine, kidney, lung, lymph nodes, prostate, testes, tonsils, skin, and uterus.

== Protein ==
=== Structure ===
==== Primary ====
The longest isoform of the C16orf95 protein has 239 amino acids. It has a conserved domain of unknown function spanning residues 76 to 239. C16orf95 has a calculated molecular weight of 26.5 kDa, and a predicted isoelectric point of 9.8. Compared to other human proteins, C16orf95 has more cysteine, arginine, and glutamine residues. It has fewer aspartate, glutamate, and asparagine. The high ratio of basic to acidic amino acids contributes to the protein's higher isoelectric point.

==== Secondary ====
C16orf95 is predicted to have several alpha-helices in its C-terminus. This is true for the human and mouse proteins. The N-terminus does not have significant cross-program consensus for secondary structure.

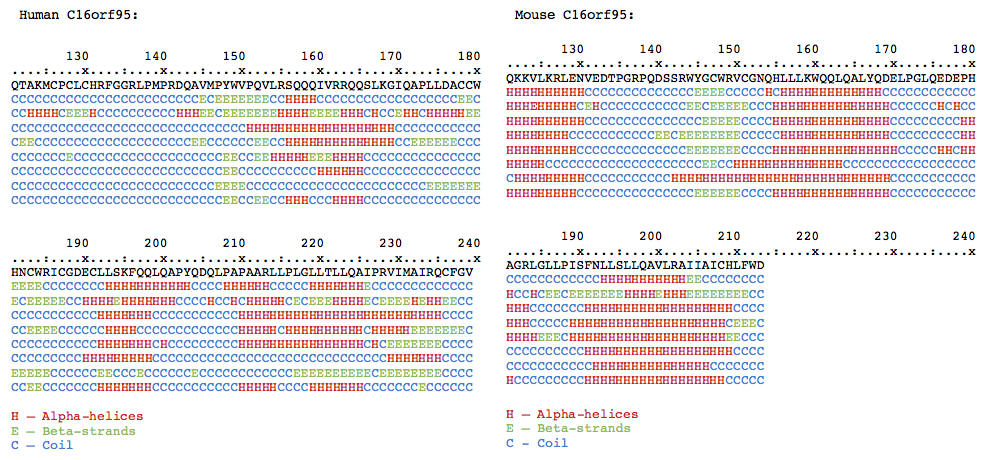
PELE compiles secondary structure predictions from multiple programs based on the amino acid sequence. Predictions for the C-termini of the human and mouse proteins are shown. There is cross-program consensus that C16orf95 has alpha-helices in its C-terminal tail. This is seen in both the human and mouse proteins.

=== Post-translational modifications ===
The tools available at ExPASy were used to predict post-translational modification sites on C16orf95. The following modifications are predicted: palmitoylation, phosphorylation, and O-linked glycosylation. Bolded residues in the table indicate sites that are conserved in more than one species.

Predicted modification	Sites - Homo sapiens	Sites - Mus musculus	Sites - Canis lupus familiaris	Tool
Palmitoylation	**C77**, C80, **C126**, C178, C187	C24, **C41**, **C90**	**C64**, **C113**, C174	CSS-Palm
Phosphorylation	S6, S9, **S53**, **T57**, **S68**, S91, **S111**, T122, **S166**	**S30**, **S76**, S89, S120, T134, S141	S15, **S35**, **T39**, **S153**	NetPhos 2.0
O-β-GlcNAc	S4, S6, S9, T57, S111	None	None	NetOGlyc 4.0

=== Evolution ===
C16orf95 has a large number of amino acid changes over time, indicating it is a quickly evolving protein.

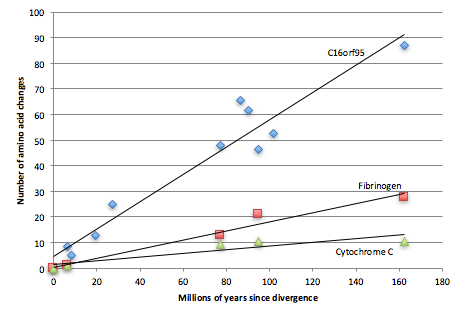
Graph of the corrected number of amino acid changes versus the approximate time of divergence. The corrected number of amino acid substitutions was calculated with the formula: – natural log (1 – observed number of substitutions) × 100. Data points are included for fibrinogen, a quickly evolving protein, and cytochrome c, a slowly evolving protein.

== Interacting proteins ==
There are no proteins known to interact with C16orf95.

== Clinical significance ==
Deletions of C16orf95 have been associated with hydronephrosis, microcephaly, distichiasis, vesicoureteral reflux, and intellectual impairment. However, the deletions included coding regions of the following genes: F-box Protein 31 (FBXO31), Microtubule-Associated Protein 1 Light Chain 3 Beta (MAP1LC3B), and Zinc Finger CCHC Type 14 (ZCCHC14). The contributions of each of these genes to the observed phenotypes has yet to be scientifically determined.
