= FBXO31 =

Protein-coding gene in the species Homo sapiens

Identifiers
- Aliases: FBXO31, FBX14, FBXO14, Fbx31, pp2386, MRT45, F-box protein 31
- External IDs: OMIM: 609102; MGI: 1354708; GeneCards: FBXO31

Gene location (Human)
Chr.	Chromosome 16 (human)
Band	16q24.2	Start	87,326,987 bp
Band	16q24.2	End	87,392,142 bp

Gene location (Mouse)
Chr.	Chromosome 8 (mouse)
Band	8|8 E1	Start	122,276,179 bp
Band	8|8 E1	End	122,305,545 bp
RNA expression pattern
Bgee	Human / Mouse (ortholog); Top expressed in: cerebellar hemisphere; right hemisphere of cerebellum; right testis; left testis; cerebellar vermis; gastrocnemius muscle; muscle of thigh; subcutaneous adipose tissue; anterior pituitary; popliteal artery / Top expressed in: muscle of thigh; interventricular septum; triceps brachii muscle; temporal muscle; digastric muscle; superior frontal gyrus; skeletal muscle tissue; sternocleidomastoid muscle; primary visual cortex; thoracic diaphragm; More reference expression data
BioGPS	n/a
Gene ontology
Molecular function	cyclin binding; ubiquitin-protein transferase activity; protein binding
Cellular component	SCF ubiquitin ligase complex; cytosol; soma; centrosome
Biological process	cell cycle; SCF-dependent proteasomal ubiquitin-dependent protein catabolic process; mitotic G1 DNA damage checkpoint signaling; protein ubiquitination; cellular response to DNA damage stimulus; protein polyubiquitination; anaphase-promoting complex-dependent catabolic process; post-translational protein modification; positive regulation of dendrite morphogenesis; positive regulation of neuron migration
Sources:Amigo / QuickGO
Orthologs
Databases	NCBI: entry; OMA: entry
Species	Human	Mouse
Entrez	79791	76454
Ensembl	ENSG00000103264	ENSMUSG00000052934
UniProt	Q5XUX0	Q3TQF0
RefSeq (mRNA)	NM_024735; NM_001282683	NM_133765
RefSeq (protein)	NP_001269612; NP_079011	NP_598526
Location (UCSC)	Chr 16: 87.33 – 87.39 Mb	Chr 8: 122.28 – 122.31 Mb
PubMed search
- Wikidata
View/Edit Human	View/Edit Mouse

F-box only protein 31 is a protein that in humans is encoded by the FBXO31 gene.

== Function ==
Members of the F-box protein family, such as FBXO31, are characterized by an approximately 40-amino acid F-box motif. SCF complexes, formed by SKP1 (MIM 601434), cullin (see CUL1; MIM 603134), and F-box proteins, act as protein-ubiquitin ligases. F-box proteins interact with SKP1 through the F box, and they interact with ubiquitination targets through other protein interaction domains.

F-box protein FBXO31 directs degradation of MDM2 to facilitate p53-mediated growth arrest following genotoxic stress. the F-box protein FBXO31, a candidate tumor suppressor encoded in 16q24.3 for which there is loss of heterozygosity in various solid tumors, is responsible for promoting MDM2 degradation. Following genotoxic stress, FBXO31 is phosphorylated by the DNA damage serine/threonine kinase ATM, resulting in increased levels of FBXO31. FBXO31 then interacts with and directs the degradation of MDM2, which is dependent on phosphorylation of MDM2 by ATM. FBXO31-mediated loss of MDM2 leads to elevated levels of p53, resulting in growth arrest. In cells depleted of FBXO31, MDM2 is not degraded and p53 levels do not increase following genotoxic stress. Thus, FBXO31 is essential for the classic robust increase in p53 levels following DNA damage.
