= 3-M syndrome =

Hereditary medical disorder

- Specialty: Medical genetics

3-M syndrome or 3M3 is a rare hereditary disorder characterized by severe growth retardation, facial dysmorphia, and skeletal abnormalities. The name 3-M is derived from the initials of the three researchers who first identified it: Miller, McKusick, and Malvaux; they reported their findings in the medical literature in 1972. Mutations in any one of the following three genes: CUL7, OBSL1, and CCDC8 are responsible for the occurrence of this disorder. It is inherited through an autosomal recessive pattern and considered very rare, so far less than 100 cases worldwide have been identified. Diagnosis is based on the presence of clinical features. Genetic testing can confirm the diagnosis and identify the specific gene involved. Treatment is aimed at addressing the growth and skeletal problems and may include surgical bone lengthening, adaptive aids, and physical therapy. An endocrinologist may assist with growth hormone replacement and appropriate evaluations during puberty.

== Symptoms and signs ==
=== Growth retardation ===
Individuals with 3-M syndrome have severe prenatal growth retardation due to growth delays during fetal development resulting in a low birth weight. Growth delays continue after birth throughout childhood and adolescence, ultimately leading to a short stature. Growth delays and immature bone development (growth retardation and delayed bone maturation) typically continue after birth (postnatally), leading to short stature (dwarfism) with proportional development of the arms and legs (as opposed to short stature with abnormally small arms and legs). In most cases, infants with 3M syndrome are unusually small and have a low birth weight despite being carried to term.

=== Facial dysmorphia ===
Many affected infants also have distinctive abnormalities of the head and facial (craniofacial) area. Many of the physical features associated with the disorder are congenital. In most cases, premature closure of fibrous joints (sagittal sutures) between certain bones (parietal bones) of the skull may restrict lateral growth of the skull, causing it to appear abnormally long and narrow that is disproportionate to the body size. In addition, the forehead may be abnormally prominent and the face may be triangular shaped with a hypo plastic mid face, pointed chin. Infants with this disorder may also have abnormally flat cheeks and cheekbones, large ears, prominent mouth with widely spread lips, and or underdeveloped upper jaw bones (maxillary hypoplasia). In addition, in some cases, the teeth may be abnormally crowded together, particularly toward the front of the mouth (anterior crowding) and as a result, the upper result, the upper jaw and lower teeth may not meet properly, they might be abnormally crowded together.

=== Skeletal abnormalities ===
Skeletal anomalies aren't present at birth but develop in the individual and include delayed bone maturation, slender long tubular bones, and tall vertebral bodies. Joint hyper-mobility and increased risk of hip dislocation has been presented in individuals. Abnormal spinal curvature, either kyhoscholiosis or hyperlordosis, causing back pain can also be experienced from this disorder.

=== Other abnormalities ===
Additional physical abnormalities include an abnormally short broad neck and thorax, square shoulders, flared shoulder blades, unusual curving of the 5th finger, and prominent heels can be seen in some children.

In some cases, males have been reported to have impaired fertility due to the reduced production of sex hormones and hypospadias which is when the opening of the urethra is on the underside of the penis instead of the tip. In contrast, females are reported to have normal ovarian function with this disorder.

== Causes ==
3-M syndrome is most often caused by a mutation in the gene CUL7 affecting three-quarters of affected individuals, including those in the Yakut population, but can also be seen with mutations in the genes OBS1 and CCDC8 at lower frequencies, about 16 percent of cases of this disorder. Mutations in other genes, some of which have not been identified, account for the remaining cases.

This is an inheritable disorder and can be passed down from parent to offspring in an autosomal recessive pattern. An individual must receive two copies of the mutated gene, one from each parent, in order to have 3-M syndrome. An individual can be a carrier for the disorder if they inherit only one mutant copy of the gene, but will not present any of the symptoms associated with the disorder.

== Mechanism ==
=== CUL7 mutations ===
The majority of 3-M syndrome patients have been identified with CUL7 mutations. The Cullin 7 gene contains instructions for making the protein Cullin-7. Cullin-7 acts as scaffold protein in the E3 ubiquitin ligase complex. The role of this complex is to tag damaged and excess proteins in the cell with ubiquitin. Intracellular and extracellular signals within the cell highly regulate when and which proteins are tagged with ubiquitin. Once attached to the protein, ubiquitin serves as a signaling molecule to the proteasomes, which then bind to the ubiquinated proteins and degrades them. This ubiquitin-proteasome system acts as the cell's quality control system by breaking down unwanted proteins. Additionally, the system regulates the level of proteins involved in critical cell activities such as the timing of cell division and growth. Mutations in the CUL7 gene blocks the ability of the cullin-7 protein to bring together the components of this E3 ubiquitin ligase complex. This leads to impaired ubiquination and hence the aggregation of damaged, misfolded, and excess proteins. Disruption of the protein degradation process plays a role in the pathogensis of prenatal growth retardation in humans, a key feature of 3-M syndrome. The skeletal abnormalities that are present in individuals with this disorder suggests that this gene may play a role in the endochondral ossification process. Preliminary data suggests that CUL7 is in fact involved in chondrocyte growth and proliferation.

=== OBS1 and CCDC8 mutations ===
Not much is known about the mutations in the genes OBS1and CCD8 and their function in growth and development so far. However, the implications of 3M syndrome suggest that both these genes encode for proteins that play a role in the CUL7 ubiquination pathway.

== Diagnosis ==
Due to the fact that many of the abnormalities associated with this disorder are congenital, the presence of these clinical features at birth is usually sufficient to make the diagnosis. Diagnosis is suggested in children with the following: low birth weight, severe growth retardation, typical facial features, and characteristic radiological findings.

In some cases, growth retardation and/or other characteristic findings suggestive of Three M syndrome may be detected before birth by ultrasound. In fetal ultrasonography, reflected sound waves are used to create an image of the developing fetus.

- Radio-graphic findings can show the skeletal malformations characteristic with this disorder, however these can only be seen in the individual after the first two years of life. These usually reveal long bones that are slender, tall vertebral bodies that shorten over time, small pelvic bones, a broad thorax with slender ribs, and delayed bone age in affected individuals.

Molecular genetic testing can be done on the individual to confirm the diagnosis and specify which of the genes were involved. The recommended order of testing the three genes is by the likelihood of a mutation occurring in that gene: 77.5% for CUL7, 16% for OBSL1, and the percentage is unknown for CCDC8 because it is so rare. Three common molecular methods used to test for mutations in a specific gene are a deletion/duplication analysis, targeted variant analysis, or a sequence analysis of the entire coding region.

== Prevention ==
Since 3-M syndrome is a genetic condition there are no known methods to preventing this disorder. However, genetic testing on expecting parents and prenatal testing, which is a molecular test that screens for any problems in the heath of a fetus during pregnancy, may be available for families with a history of this disorder to determine the fetus's risk in inheriting this genetic disorder.

== Treatment ==
Treatment of 3-M syndrome is aimed at the specific symptoms presented in each individual. With the various symptoms of this disorder being properly managed and affected individuals having normal mental development, 3-M syndrome is not a life - threatening condition and individuals are able to lead a near normal life with normal life expectancy.

Treatment may involve the coordinated efforts of many healthcare professionals, such as pediatricians, orthopedists, dentists and/or other specialists depending on the symptoms.

- Possible management options for short stature are surgical bone lengthening or growth hormone therapy.
- Orthopedic techniques and surgery may be used to treat certain skeletal abnormalities.
- Plastic surgery may also be performed on individuals to help correct certain cranio-facial anomalies.
- Individuals with dental abnormalities may undergo corrective procedures such as braces or oral surgeries.

Genetic counseling will be of benefit for affected individuals and their families. Family members of affected individuals should also receive regular clinical evaluations to detect any symptoms and physical characteristics that may be potentially associated with Three M syndrome or heterozygosity for the disorder. Other treatment for Three M syndrome is symptomatic and supportive.

Once diagnosed the child should be seen and monitored for growth and pubertal progress and for consideration of growth hormone (GH) therapy. It is recommended every 6–12 months until achievement of final height. Adaptive aids for people with short stature and physiotherapy are possible treatment options.

Newborns should have a hip ultrasound scan to screen for developmental dysplasia of the hip. Children can be treated can be treated with recombinant human GH (r-hGH). In genera, the response is modest, however a trial of treatment over 1 year may show a reasonable response. In this case, r-hGH should be continued long-term. Higher r-hGH doses have been used in individual cases. The issues of fertility should be discussed with male patients at the end of puberty and semen analysis offered.

== Research directions ==
- One study looks at 33 cases of 3M syndrome, 23 of these cases were identified as CUL7 mutations: 12 being homozygotes and 11 being heterozygotes. This new research shows genetic heterogeneity in 3M syndrome, in contrast to the clinical homogeneity. Additional studies are still ongoing and will lead to the understanding of this new information.
- This study provides more insight on the three genes involved in 3M syndrome and how they interact with each other in normal development. It led to the discovery that the CUL7, OBS1, and CCDC8 form a complex that functions to maintain microtubule and genomic integrity.
- Recent studies propose that CUL&, OBSL1, and CCDC8 proteins form a 3M complex that functions in maintaining microtubule and genome integrity and normal development.
