= RBX1 =

Protein-coding gene in the species Homo sapiens

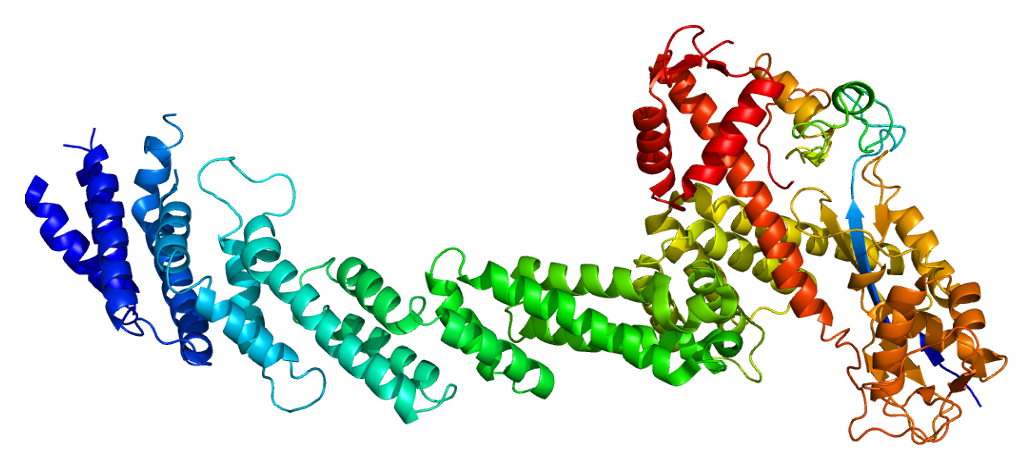

Identifiers
- Aliases: RBX1, BA554C12.1, RNF75, ROC1, ring-box 1
- External IDs: OMIM: 603814; MGI: 3710517; GeneCards: RBX1
Available structures
PDB	Human UniProt search: PDBe RCSB
PDB	List of PDB id codes 1LDJ, 1LDK, 1U6G, 2HYE, 2LGV, 3DPL, 3DQV, 3RTR, 4F52, 4P5O
Enzyme activity
EC #	BRENDA	ExPASy	KEGG	MetaCyc
2.3.2.27	↗	↗	↗	↗
2.3.2.32	↗	↗	↗	↗

Gene location (Human)
Chr.	Chromosome 22 (human)
Band	22q13.2	Start	40,951,347 bp
Band	22q13.2	End	40,973,309 bp
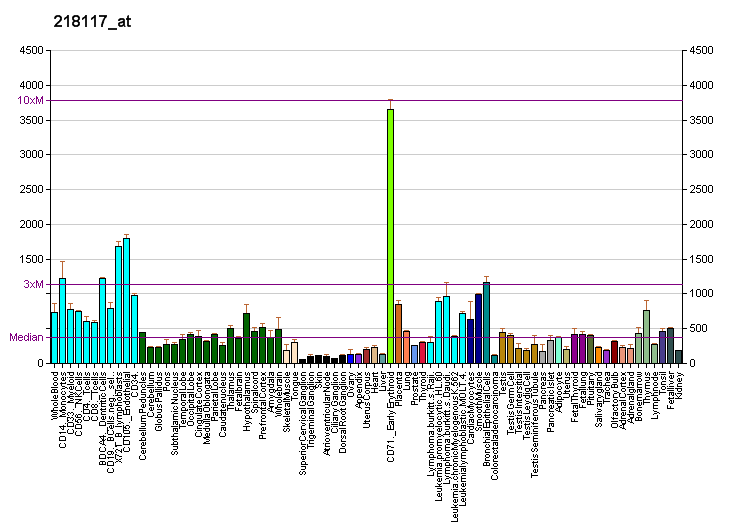
RNA expression pattern
Bgee	Human / Mouse (ortholog); Top expressed in: periodontal fiber; trabecular bone; Skeletal muscle tissue of rectus abdominis; right ventricle; monocyte; palpebral conjunctiva; beta cell; C1 segment; olfactory bulb; oral cavity / n/a; More reference expression data
BioGPS	More reference expression data
Gene ontology
Molecular function	cullin family protein binding; ubiquitin protein ligase activity; zinc ion binding; metal ion binding; ubiquitin-ubiquitin ligase activity; protein binding; ubiquitin protein ligase binding; ubiquitin-protein transferase activity; NEDD8 transferase activity; transcription factor binding; transferase activity; protein-containing complex binding
Cellular component	cytoplasm; cullin-RING ubiquitin ligase complex; cytosol; SCF ubiquitin ligase complex; VCB complex; Cul2-RING ubiquitin ligase complex; Cul3-RING ubiquitin ligase complex; Cul5-RING ubiquitin ligase complex; Cul7-RING ubiquitin ligase complex; Cul4A-RING E3 ubiquitin ligase complex; Cul4B-RING E3 ubiquitin ligase complex; nucleus; nucleoplasm; nuclear SCF ubiquitin ligase complex; Cul4-RING E3 ubiquitin ligase complex
Biological process	nucleotide-excision repair, DNA damage recognition; protein monoubiquitination; MAPK cascade; cellular response to DNA damage stimulus; protein neddylation; global genome nucleotide-excision repair; protein catabolic process; regulation of transcription from RNA polymerase II promoter in response to hypoxia; transcription-coupled nucleotide-excision repair; nucleotide-excision repair, DNA incision; negative regulation of canonical Wnt signaling pathway; nucleotide-excision repair, preincision complex stabilization; DNA repair; viral process; protein polyubiquitination; nucleotide-excision repair, preincision complex assembly; nucleotide-excision repair, DNA incision, 5'-to lesion; Wnt signaling pathway; SCF complex assembly; negative regulation of G2/M transition of mitotic cell cycle; post-translational protein modification; positive regulation of proteasomal ubiquitin-dependent protein catabolic process; interleukin-1-mediated signaling pathway; protein ubiquitination; SCF-dependent proteasomal ubiquitin-dependent protein catabolic process; proteasome-mediated ubiquitin-dependent protein catabolic process; ubiquitin-dependent protein catabolic process; nucleotide-excision repair, DNA duplex unwinding; nucleotide-excision repair, DNA incision, 3'-to lesion
Sources:Amigo / QuickGO
Orthologs
Databases	NCBI: entry; OMA: entry
Species	Human	Mouse
Entrez	9978	100043674
Ensembl	ENSG00000100387	n/a
UniProt	P62877	n/a
RefSeq (mRNA)	NM_014248	XM_006525232; XM_006536722; XM_006537452
RefSeq (protein)	NP_055063	n/a
Location (UCSC)	Chr 22: 40.95 – 40.97 Mb	n/a
PubMed search
- Wikidata
View/Edit Human	View/Edit Mouse

RING-box protein 1 is a protein that in humans is encoded by the RBX1 gene.

== Function ==
This gene encodes an evolutionarily conserved protein that interacts with cullins. The protein plays a unique role in the ubiquitination reaction by heterodimerizing with cullin-1 to catalyze ubiquitin polymerization. It also may be involved in the regulation of protein turn-over.

== Interactions ==
RBX1 has been shown to interact with:

- CAND1,
- CUL1,
- CUL2,
- CUL4A,
- CUL5
- CUL7,
- DCUN1D1, and
- P70-S6 Kinase 1.
