= CSN1S1 =

Protein-coding gene in humans

Identifiers
- Aliases: CSN1S1, CASA, CSN1, casein alpha s1
- External IDs: OMIM: 115450; GeneCards: CSN1S1

Gene location (Human)
Chr.	Chromosome 4 (human)
Band	4q13.3	Start	69,931,068 bp
Band	4q13.3	End	69,946,574 bp
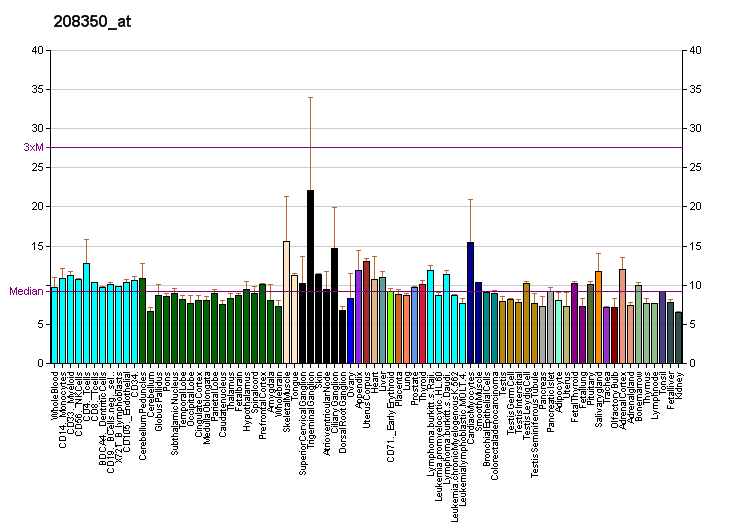
RNA expression pattern
Bgee	Human / Mouse (ortholog); Top expressed in: testicle; parotid gland; synovial membrane; gonad; synovial joint; adipose tissue; subcutaneous adipose tissue; lactiferous gland; cingulate gyrus; anterior cingulate cortex / n/a; More reference expression data
BioGPS	More reference expression data
Gene ontology
Molecular function	transporter activity
Cellular component	extracellular region; extracellular space
Biological process	transmembrane transport; transport; response to estradiol; response to progesterone; response to dehydroepiandrosterone; response to 11-deoxycorticosterone
Sources:Amigo / QuickGO
Orthologs
Databases	NCBI: entry; OMA: entry
Species	Human	Mouse
Entrez	1446	n/a
Ensembl	ENSG00000126545	n/a
UniProt	P47710	n/a
RefSeq (mRNA)	NM_001025104; NM_001890	n/a
RefSeq (protein)	NP_001020275; NP_001881	n/a
Location (UCSC)	Chr 4: 69.93 – 69.95 Mb	n/a
PubMed search		n/a
- Wikidata
View/Edit Human

Alpha-S1-casein is a protein that in humans is encoded by the CSN1S1 gene.

== Interactions ==
CSN1S1 has been shown to interact with SAP130.
