= ANAPC11 =

Protein-coding gene in the species Homo sapiens

Identifiers
- Aliases: ANAPC11, APC11, Apc11p, HSPC214, anaphase promoting complex subunit 11
- External IDs: OMIM: 614534; MGI: 1913406; GeneCards: ANAPC11
Available structures
PDB	Ortholog search: PDBe RCSB
PDB	List of PDB id codes 2MT5, 4R2Y, 4UI9, 5A31, 5G04, 5JG6, 5G05

Gene location (Human)
Chr.	Chromosome 17 (human)
Band	17q25.3	Start	81,890,790 bp
Band	17q25.3	End	81,900,991 bp

Gene location (Mouse)
Chr.	Chromosome 11 (mouse)
Band	11|11 E2	Start	120,489,247 bp
Band	11|11 E2	End	120,499,024 bp
RNA expression pattern
Bgee	Human / Mouse (ortholog); Top expressed in: right testis; left testis; apex of heart; temporal lobe; muscle of thigh; amygdala; left ventricle; gastrocnemius muscle; right auricle of heart; substantia nigra / Top expressed in: atrium; yolk sac; embryo; morula; efferent ductule; medial ganglionic eminence; optic nerve; epiblast; Ileal epithelium; human fetus; More reference expression data
BioGPS	n/a
Gene ontology
Molecular function	cullin family protein binding; ubiquitin protein ligase activity; metal ion binding; ubiquitin-protein transferase activity; ubiquitin-ubiquitin ligase activity
Cellular component	cytoplasm; cytosol; anaphase-promoting complex; nucleus; nucleoplasm; nucleolus; cullin-RING ubiquitin ligase complex
Biological process	protein K11-linked ubiquitination; cell division; protein ubiquitination; cell cycle; anaphase-promoting complex-dependent catabolic process; mitotic cell cycle; positive regulation of mitotic metaphase/anaphase transition; ubiquitin-dependent protein catabolic process; regulation of mitotic cell cycle phase transition
Sources:Amigo / QuickGO
Orthologs
Databases	NCBI: entry; OMA: entry
Species	Human	Mouse
Entrez	51529	66156
Ensembl	ENSG00000141552	ENSMUSG00000025135
UniProt	Q9NYG5	Q9CPX9
RefSeq (mRNA)	NM_016476; NM_001002244; NM_001002245; NM_001002246; NM_001002247 NM_001002248; NM_001002249; NM_001289414; NM_001289415; NM_001289416; NM_001289417; NM_001289418; NM_001289419; NM_001289420	NM_001038230; NM_025389
RefSeq (protein)	NP_001002244; NP_001002245; NP_001002246; NP_001002247; NP_001002248 NP_001002249; NP_001276343; NP_001276344; NP_001276345; NP_001276346; NP_001276349; NP_057560	NP_001033319; NP_079665
Location (UCSC)	Chr 17: 81.89 – 81.9 Mb	Chr 11: 120.49 – 120.5 Mb
PubMed search
- Wikidata
View/Edit Human	View/Edit Mouse

Anaphase-promoting complex subunit 11 is an enzyme that in humans is encoded by the ANAPC11 gene.

== Interactions ==
ANAPC11 has been shown to interact with ANAPC2 and CDC27.
