= CKS1B =

Protein found in humans

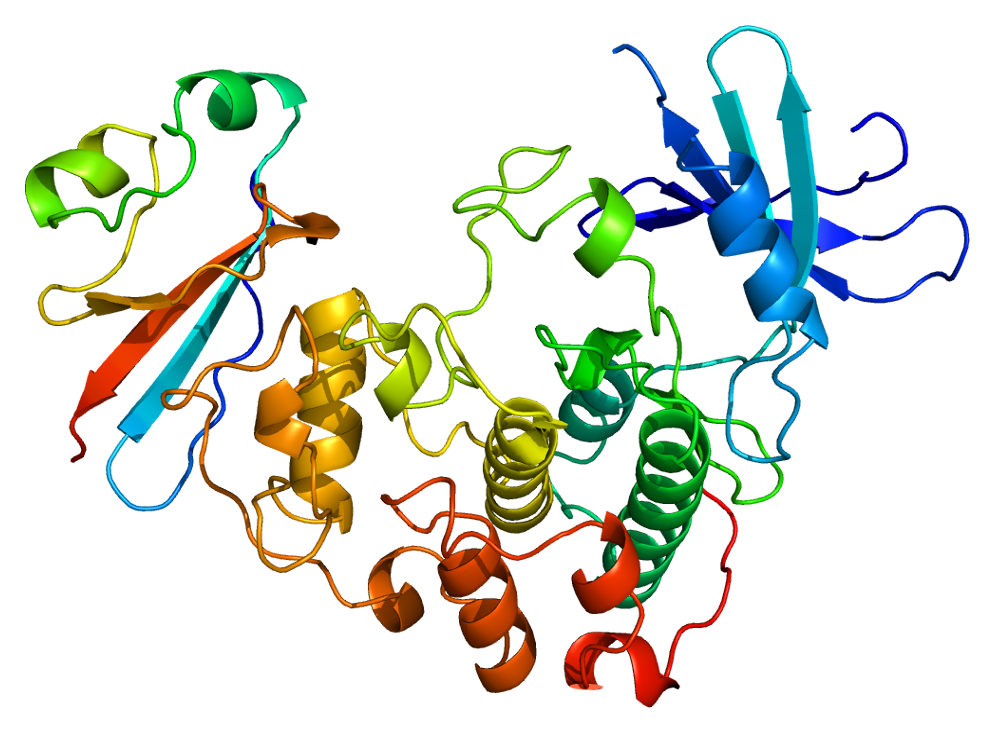

Identifiers
- Aliases: CKS1B, CKS1, PNAS-16, PNAS-18, ckshs1, CDC28 protein kinase regulatory subunit 1B
- External IDs: OMIM: 116900; MGI: 1889208; GeneCards: CKS1B
Available structures
PDB	Ortholog search: PDBe RCSB
PDB	List of PDB id codes 1BUH, 1DKS, 1DKT, 2ASS, 2AST, 4YC6

Gene location (Human)
Chr.	Chromosome 1 (human)
Band	1q21.3	Start	154,974,653 bp
Band	1q21.3	End	154,979,251 bp

Gene location (Mouse)
Chr.	Chromosome 3 (mouse)
Band	3|3 F1	Start	89,322,779 bp
Band	3|3 F1	End	89,325,690 bp
RNA expression pattern
Bgee	Human / Mouse (ortholog); Top expressed in: ventricular zone; ganglionic eminence; lymph node; mucosa of transverse colon; placenta; rectum; testicle; subcutaneous adipose tissue; gonad; mucosa of esophagus / Top expressed in: endocardial cushion; mandibular prominence; maxillary prominence; ureter; medullary collecting duct; renal corpuscle; somite; atrioventricular valve; Gonadal ridge; abdominal wall; More reference expression data
BioGPS	n/a
Gene ontology
Molecular function	cyclin-dependent protein serine/threonine kinase regulator activity; protein binding; histone binding; protein kinase binding; cyclin-dependent protein serine/threonine kinase activator activity; ubiquitin binding
Cellular component	nucleoplasm; SCF ubiquitin ligase complex; cyclin-dependent protein kinase holoenzyme complex
Biological process	cell cycle; cell division; regulation of mitotic cell cycle; positive regulation of cyclin-dependent protein serine/threonine kinase activity; positive regulation of transcription, DNA-templated; regulation of transcription, DNA-templated; cell population proliferation; mitotic cell cycle phase transition; regulation of cyclin-dependent protein serine/threonine kinase activity
Sources:Amigo / QuickGO
Orthologs
Databases	NCBI: entry; OMA: entry
Species	Human	Mouse
Entrez	1163	54124
Ensembl	ENSG00000173207	ENSMUSG00000028044
UniProt	P61024	P61025
RefSeq (mRNA)	NM_001826	NM_016904
RefSeq (protein)	NP_001817	NP_058600
Location (UCSC)	Chr 1: 154.97 – 154.98 Mb	Chr 3: 89.32 – 89.33 Mb
PubMed search
- Wikidata
View/Edit Human	View/Edit Mouse

Cyclin-dependent kinases regulatory subunit 1 is a protein that in humans is encoded by the CKS1B gene.

== Function ==
The CKS1B protein binds to the catalytic subunit of the cyclin-dependent kinases and is essential for their biological function. The CKS1B mRNA is found to be expressed in different patterns through the cell cycle in HeLa cells, which reflects a specialized role for the encoded protein.

CKS1B and CKS2 proteins have demonstrated principal roles in cell cycle regulation. Defined originally as suppressors of mutations in both fission and budding yeast Cdk1 genes, Cks molecules interact with Cdk1, Cdk2 and Cdk3. These Cdk-dependent enzyme complexes in cell cycle regulation frequently consist of Cdk molecules bound to a catalytic Cdk subunit, i.e. Cks and a regulatory cyclin subunit, such as a G1 cyclin, controlling Cdk function by directing cyclin-cdk complex activity toward specific and significant substrates. Malfunctions of cdk-dependent associations lead to defects into the entry of mitosis for cells.

Cks1 in the Cdk-independent pathway involves the recognition of substrates p27^{Kip1} and p21^{cip1} by directly associating with E3 SCF^{Skp2} when stimulated by certain mitogenic signals, such as TGF-β.

== Clinical significance ==
Cks1-depleted breast cancer cells not only exhibit slowed G(1) progression, but also accumulate in G(2)-M due to blocked mitotic entry. Cdk1 expression, which is crucial for M phase entry, is drastically diminished by Cks1 depletion, and that restoration of cdk1 reduces G(2)-M accumulation in Cks1-depleted cells.

== Interactions ==
CKS1B has been shown to interact with SKP2 and CDKN1B.
