= SKP2 =

Protein-coding gene in the species Homo sapiens

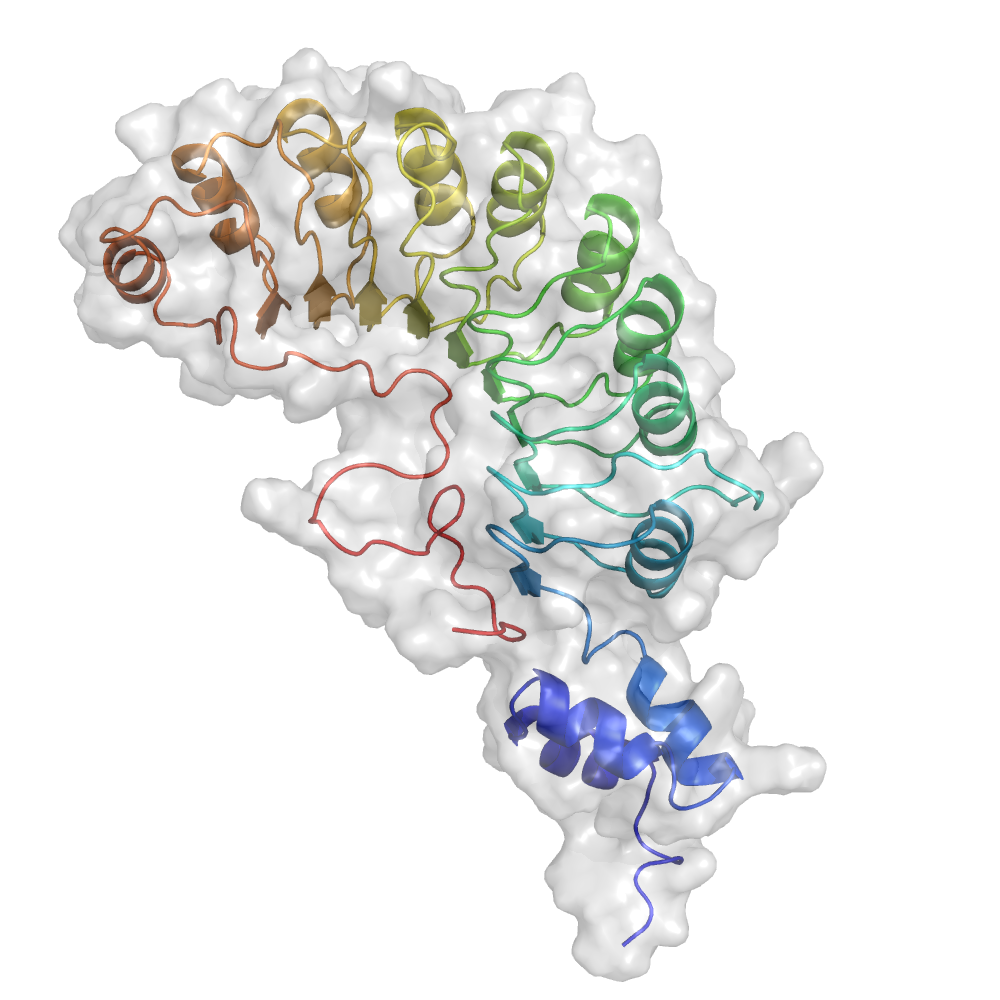

Identifiers
- Aliases: SKP2, FBL1, FBXL1, FLB1, p45, S-phase kinase-associated protein 2, E3 ubiquitin protein ligase, S-phase kinase associated protein 2
- External IDs: OMIM: 601436; MGI: 1351663; GeneCards: SKP2
Available structures
PDB	Ortholog search: PDBe RCSB
PDB	List of PDB id codes 1FQV, 1FS1, 1FS2, 1LDK, 2ASS, 2AST

Gene location (Human)
Chr.	Chromosome 5 (human)
Band	5p13.2	Start	36,151,989 bp
Band	5p13.2	End	36,196,849 bp

Gene location (Mouse)
Chr.	Chromosome 15 (mouse)
Band	15|15 A1	Start	9,112,073 bp
Band	15|15 A1	End	9,155,512 bp
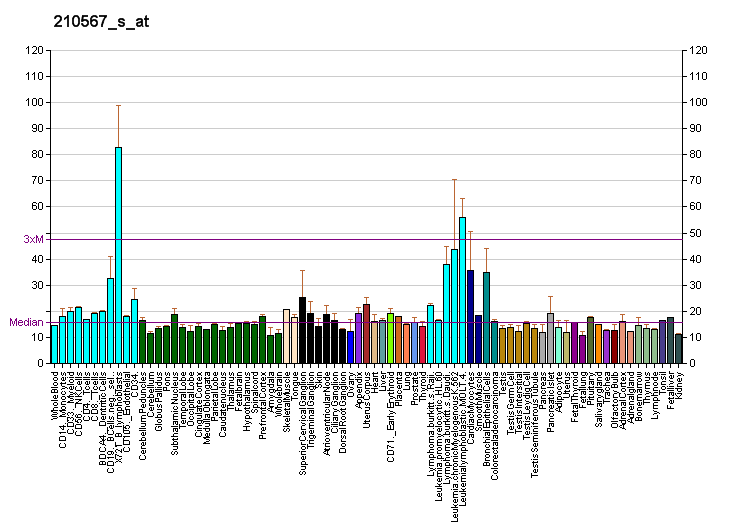

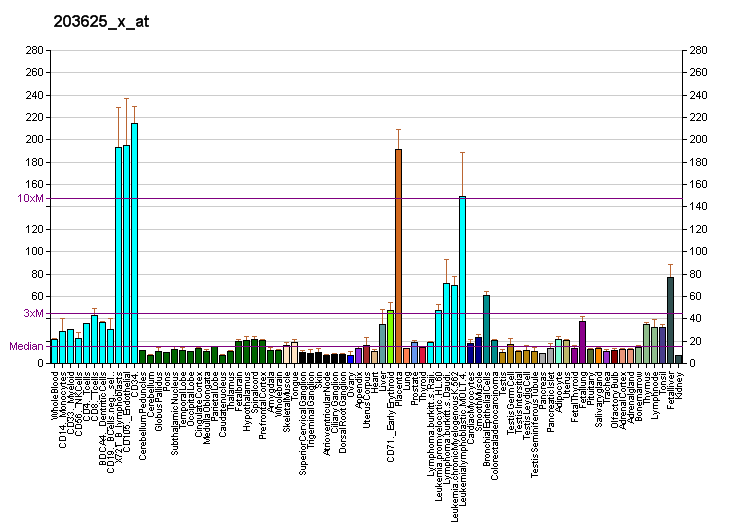

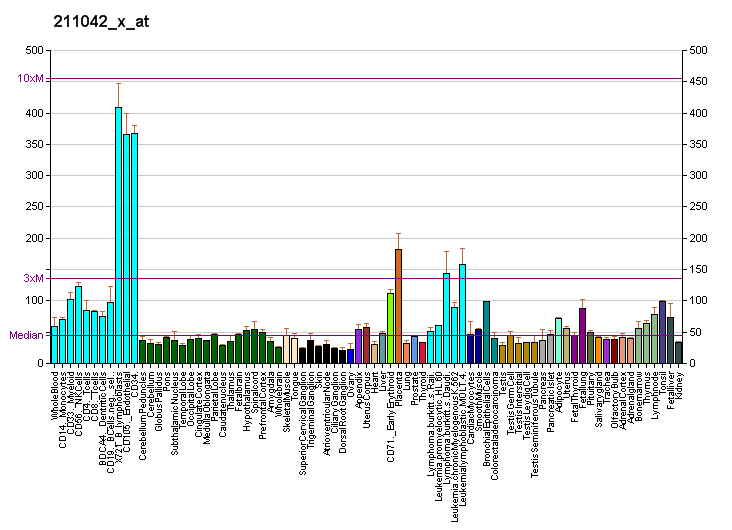
RNA expression pattern
Bgee	Human / Mouse (ortholog); Top expressed in: oocyte; secondary oocyte; placenta; ventricular zone; embryo; gingival epithelium; buccal mucosa cell; ganglionic eminence; tibia; endothelial cell / Top expressed in: maxillary prominence; mandibular prominence; primitive streak; abdominal wall; hand; otic vesicle; Rostral migratory stream; otic placode; dermis; human fetus; More reference expression data
BioGPS	More reference expression data
Gene ontology
Molecular function	ubiquitin protein ligase activity; protein binding; identical protein binding; ubiquitin-protein transferase activity
Cellular component	nucleoplasm; nucleolus; SCF ubiquitin ligase complex; nucleus; cytoplasm; cytosol
Biological process	regulation of apoptotic process; cellular response to cell-matrix adhesion; positive regulation of intracellular estrogen receptor signaling pathway; ubiquitin-dependent protein catabolic process; regulation of cell cycle; G2/M transition of mitotic cell cycle; protein ubiquitination; positive regulation of protein polyubiquitination; cell population proliferation; positive regulation of smooth muscle cell proliferation; protein polyubiquitination; protein deubiquitination; post-translational protein modification; G1/S transition of mitotic cell cycle; SCF-dependent proteasomal ubiquitin-dependent protein catabolic process; proteasome-mediated ubiquitin-dependent protein catabolic process; innate immune response; defense response to virus; protein K48-linked ubiquitination; immune system process; viral process
Sources:Amigo / QuickGO
Orthologs
Databases	NCBI: entry; OMA: entry
Species	Human	Mouse
Entrez	6502	27401
Ensembl	ENSG00000145604	ENSMUSG00000054115
UniProt	Q13309	Q9Z0Z3
RefSeq (mRNA)	NM_001243120; NM_005983; NM_032637	NM_001285980; NM_013787; NM_145468
RefSeq (protein)	NP_001230049; NP_005974; NP_116026	NP_001272909; NP_038815
Location (UCSC)	Chr 5: 36.15 – 36.2 Mb	Chr 15: 9.11 – 9.16 Mb
PubMed search
- Wikidata
View/Edit Human	View/Edit Mouse

S-phase kinase-associated protein 2 is an enzyme that in humans is encoded by the SKP2 gene.

== Structure ==
Skp2 contains 424 residues in total with the ~40 amino acid F-box domain lying closer to the N-terminal region at the 94-140 position and the C-terminal region forming a concave surface consisting of ten leucine-rich repeats (LRRs). The F-box proteins constitute one of the four subunits of ubiquitin protein ligase complex called SCFs (SKP1-cullin-F-box), which often—but not always—recognize substrates in a phosphorylation-dependent manner. In this SCF complex, Skp2 acts as the substrate recognition factor.

=== F-box domain ===
The F-box proteins are divided into three classes: Fbxws containing WD40 repeat domains, Fbxls containing leucine-rich repeats, and Fbxos containing either different protein–protein interaction modules or no recognizable motifs. The protein encoded by this gene belongs to the Fbxls class. In addition to an F-box, this protein contains 10 tandem leucine-rich repeats. Alternative splicing of this gene generates 2 transcript variants encoding different isoforms. After the tenth LRR, the ~30-residue C-terminal tail turns back towards the first LRR, forming what has been referred to as a 'safety-belt' that might aid to pin down substrates into the concave surface formed by the LRRs.

Skp2 forms a stable complex with the cyclin A-CDK2 S-phase kinase. It specifically recognizes and promotes the degradation of phosphorylated cyclin-dependent kinase inhibitor 1B (CDKN1B, also referred to as p27 or KIP1) predominantly in S, G2 phase, and the initial part of the M phase.

The degradation of p27 via Skp2 requires the accessory protein CKS1B. To prevent premature degradation of p27, Skp2 levels are kept low during early and mid-G1 due to the APC/C^{Cdh1}ubiquitin ligase, which mediates the ubiquitylation of Skp2.

Phosphorylation of Ser64 and, to a lesser extent, Ser72 of Skp2 contributes to the stabilization of Skp2 by preventing its association with APC/C^{Cdh1}; however, Skp2 phosphorylation on these residues is dispensable for its subcellular localization and for Skp2 assembly into an active SCF ubiquitin ligase.

== Function ==
Progression through the cell cycle is tightly regulated by cyclin-dependent kinases (CDKs), and their interactions with cyclins and CDK inhibitors (CKIs). Relative amounts of these signals oscillate during each stage of the cell cycle due to periodic proteolysis; the ubiquitin-proteasome system mediates the degradation of these mitotic regulatory proteins, controlling their intracellular concentrations. These and other proteins are recognized and degraded by the proteasome from the sequential action of three enzymes: E1 (ubiquitin-activating enzyme), one of many E2s (ubiquitin-conjugating enzyme), and one of many E3 ubiquitin ligase. The specificity of ubiquitination is provided by the E3 ligases; these ligases physically interact with the target substrates. Skp2 is the substrate recruiting component of the SCFSkp2 complex, which targets cell cycle control elements, such as p27 and p21. Here, SKP2 has been implicated in double negative feedback loops with both p21 and p27, that control cell cycle entry and G1/S transition.

== Clinical significance ==
Skp2 behaves as an oncogene in cell systems and is an established protooncogene causally involved in the pathogenesis of lymphomas. One of the most critical CDK inhibitors involved in cancer pathogenesis is p27^{Kip1}, which is involved primarily in inhibiting cyclin E-CDK2 complexes (and to a lesser extent cyclin D-CDK4 complexes). Levels of p27^{Kip1} (like all other CKIs) rise and fall in cells as they either exit or re-enter the cell cycle, these levels are not modulated at the transcriptional level, but by the actions of the SCFSkp2 complex in recognizing p27^{Kip1} and tagging it for destruction in the proteasome system. It has been shown that as cells enter G_{0} phase, reducing levels of Skp2 explain the increase in p27^{Kip1}, creating an apparent inverse relationship between Skp2 and p27^{Kip1}. Robust evidence has been amassed that strongly suggests Skp2 plays an important role in cancer and is also involved in cancer-associated drug resistance.

=== Overexpression ===
Overexpression of Skp2 is frequently observed in human cancer progression and metastasis, and evidence suggests that Skp2 plays a proto-oncogenic role both in vitro and in vivo. Skp2 overexpression has been seen in: lymphomas, prostate cancer, melanoma, nasopharyngeal carcinoma, pancreatic cancer, and breast carcinomas. Additionally, overexpression of Skp2 is correlated with a poor prognosis in breast cancer. As one would expect, Skp2 overexpression promotes growth and tumorigenesis in a xenograft tumor model. By extension of this fact, Skp2 inactivation profoundly restricts cancer development by triggering a massive cellular senescence and/or apoptosis response that is surprisingly observed only in oncogenic conditions in vivo. This response is triggered in a p19Arf/p53-independent, but p27-dependent manner.

Using a Skp2 knockout mouse model, multiple groups have shown Skp2 is required for cancer development in different conditions of tumor promotion, including PTEN, ARF, pRB inactivation as well as Her2/Neu overexpression.

Genetic approaches have demonstrated that Skp2 deficiency inhibits cancer development in multiple mouse models by inducing p53-independent cellular senescence and blocking Akt-mediated aerobic glycolysis. Akt activation by Skp2 is linked to aerobic glycolysis, as Skp2 deficiency impairs Akt activation, Glut1 expression, and glucose uptake thereby promoting cancer development.

=== Potential use as a clinical target ===
Skp2 is of considerable interest as a novel and attractive target for cancer therapeutical development, as disrupting the SCF complex will result in increased levels of p27, which will inhibit aberrant cellular proliferation. Although Skp2 is an enzyme, its function requires the assembly of the other members of the SCF complex. As Skp2 is the rate-limiting component of the SCF complex, effective inhibitors should be focused on the interfaces of Skp2 with the other members of the SCF complex, which is much more difficult than traditional enzyme inhibition. Small molecule inhibitors of the binding site between Skp2 and its substrate p27 have been discovered, and these inhibitors induce p27 accumulation in a Skp2-dependent manner and promote cell cycle arrest. Another recent discovery were inhibitors of the Skp1/Skp2 interface that resulted in: restoring p27 levels, suppressing survival, trigger p53-independent senescence, exhibit potent antitumor activity in multiple animal models, and were also found to affect Akt-mediated glycolysis. Skp2 is a potential target for pten-deficient cancers.

== Interactions ==
SKP2 has been shown to interact with:

- CCNA2,
- CDK2,
- CDKN1A
- CDKN1B
- CKS1B,
- CDT1,
- CUL1
- E2F1,
- ORC1L, and
- SKP1A.
