= CAND1 =

Protein-coding gene in humans

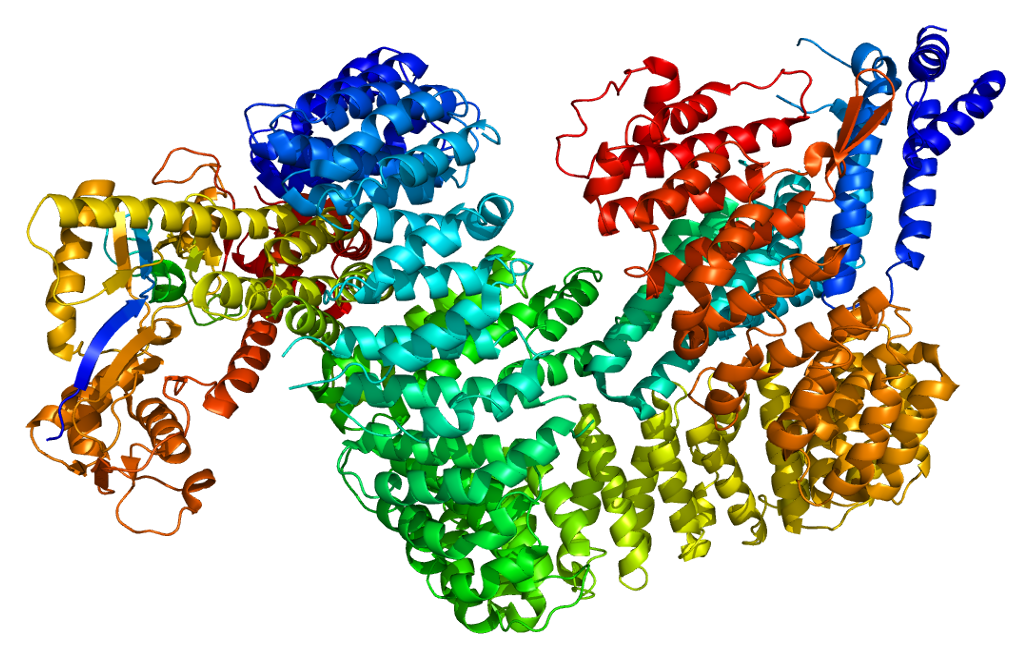

Identifiers
- Aliases: CAND1, TIP120, TIP120A, cullin associated and neddylation dissociated 1
- External IDs: OMIM: 607727; MGI: 1261820; GeneCards: CAND1
Available structures
PDB	Ortholog search: PDBe RCSB
PDB	List of PDB id codes 1U6G, 4A0C

Gene location (Human)
Chr.	Chromosome 12 (human)
Band	12q14.3-q15	Start	67,269,358 bp
Band	12q14.3-q15	End	67,319,953 bp

Gene location (Mouse)
Chr.	Chromosome 10 (mouse)
Band	10 D2|10 67.08 cM	Start	119,035,160 bp
Band	10 D2|10 67.08 cM	End	119,075,960 bp
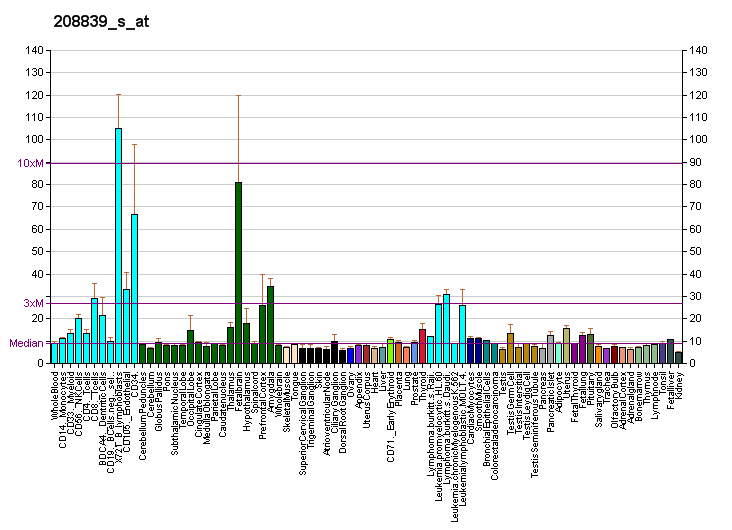

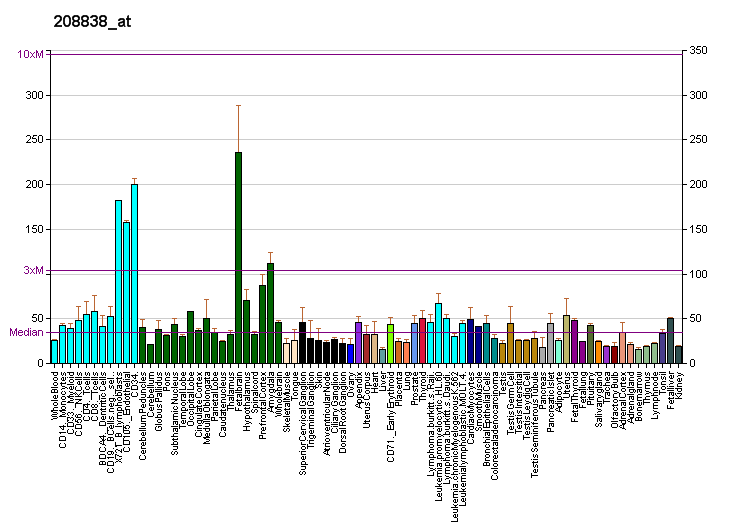

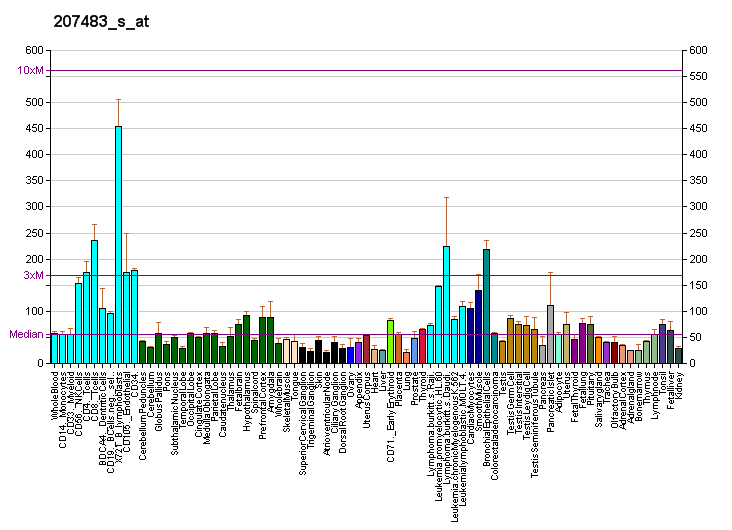
RNA expression pattern
Bgee	Human / Mouse (ortholog); Top expressed in: ventricular zone; ganglionic eminence; stromal cell of endometrium; Achilles tendon; islet of Langerhans; endothelial cell; appendix; left ovary; right ovary; parietal pleura / Top expressed in: spermatocyte; spermatid; tail of embryo; somite; mandibular prominence; maxillary prominence; Gonadal ridge; epiblast; cumulus cell; morula; More reference expression data
BioGPS	More reference expression data
Gene ontology
Molecular function	TBP-class protein binding; protein binding
Cellular component	cytoplasm; cullin-RING ubiquitin ligase complex; Golgi apparatus; extracellular exosome; membrane; nucleus; ubiquitin ligase complex; extracellular region; secretory granule lumen; ficolin-1-rich granule lumen; nucleoplasm; cytosol
Biological process	positive regulation of transcription, DNA-templated; SCF complex assembly; cell differentiation; positive regulation of RNA polymerase II transcription preinitiation complex assembly; negative regulation of catalytic activity; protein ubiquitination; neutrophil degranulation; cellular iron ion homeostasis; post-translational protein modification
Sources:Amigo / QuickGO
Orthologs
Databases	NCBI: entry; OMA: entry
Species	Human	Mouse
Entrez	55832	71902
Ensembl	ENSG00000111530	ENSMUSG00000020114
UniProt	Q86VP6	Q6ZQ38
RefSeq (mRNA)	NM_001329674; NM_001329675; NM_001329676; NM_018448	NM_027994
RefSeq (protein)	NP_001316603; NP_001316604; NP_001316605; NP_060918	NP_082270
Location (UCSC)	Chr 12: 67.27 – 67.32 Mb	Chr 10: 119.04 – 119.08 Mb
PubMed search
- Wikidata
View/Edit Human	View/Edit Mouse

Cullin-associated NEDD8-dissociated protein 1 is a protein that in humans is encoded by the CAND1 gene.

== Interactions ==
CAND1 has been shown to interact with:

- CUL1,
- CUL2,
- CUL3,
- CUL4A,
- CUL4B,
- DCUN1D1, and
- RBX1.
