= Cullin-5 =

Protein found in humans

CUL5
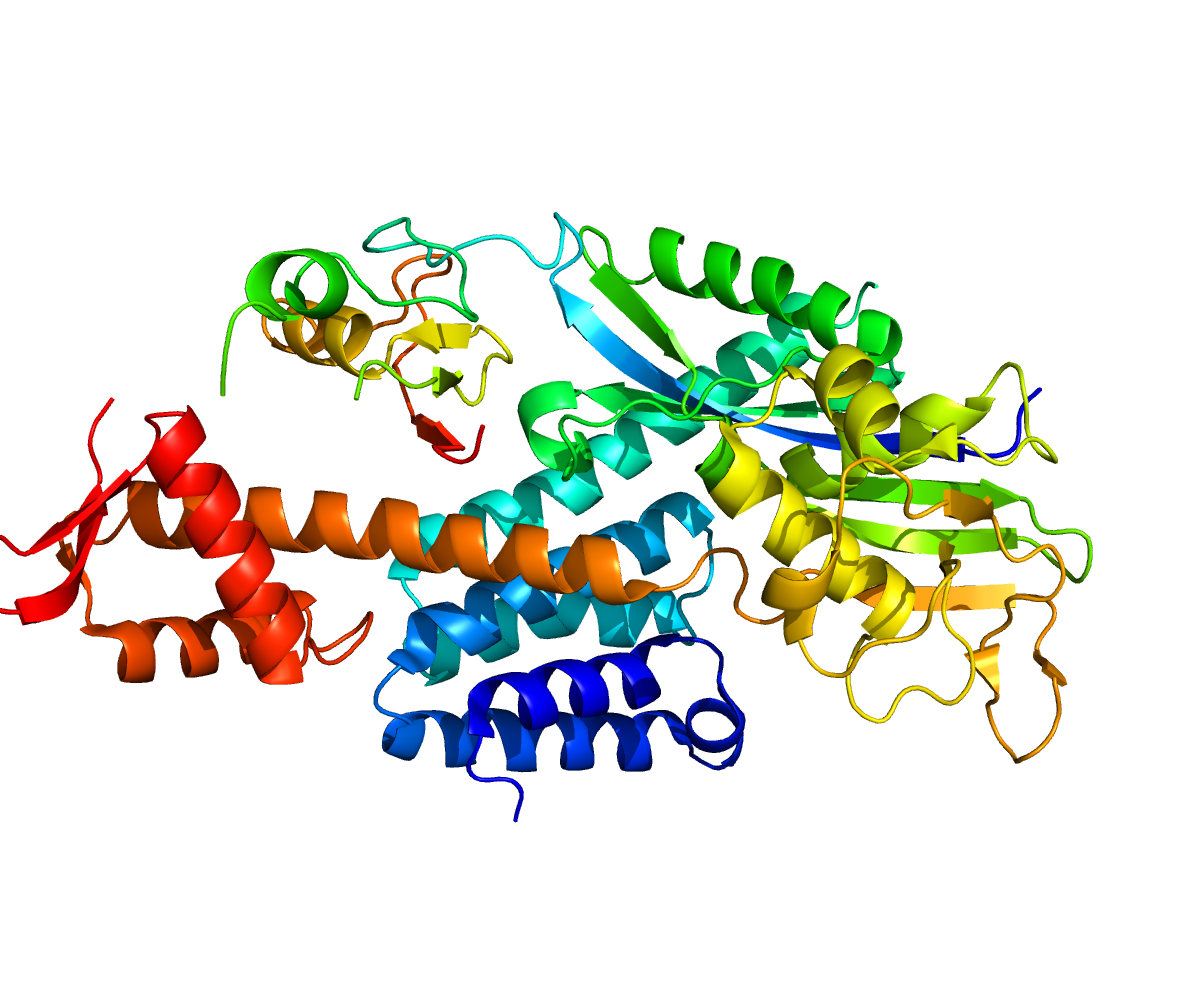

Identifiers
- Aliases: CUL5, VACM-1, VACM1, cullin 5, CUL-5
- External IDs: OMIM: 601741; MGI: 1922967; GeneCards: CUL5
Available structures
PDB	Ortholog search: PDBe RCSB
PDB	List of PDB id codes 3DPL, 3DQV, 4JGH, 4N9F

Gene location (Human)
Chr.	Chromosome 11 (human)
Band	11q22.3	Start	108,008,898 bp
Band	11q22.3	End	108,107,761 bp

Gene location (Mouse)
Chr.	Chromosome 9 (mouse)
Band	9|9 A5.3	Start	53,525,882 bp
Band	9|9 A5.3	End	53,581,314 bp
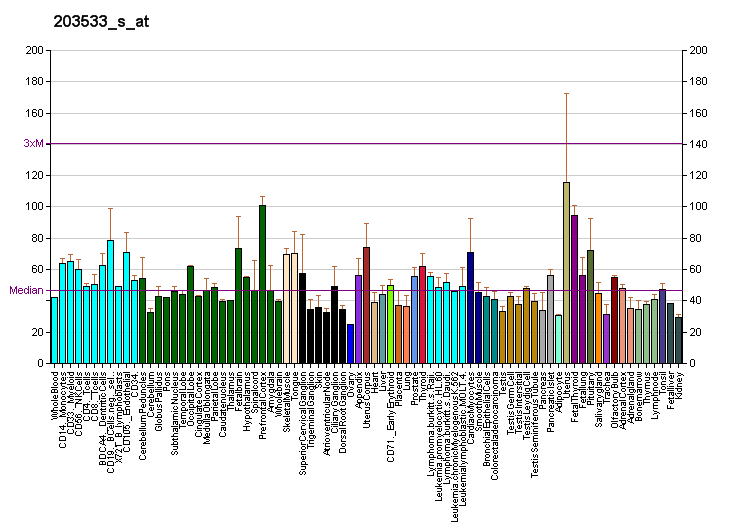

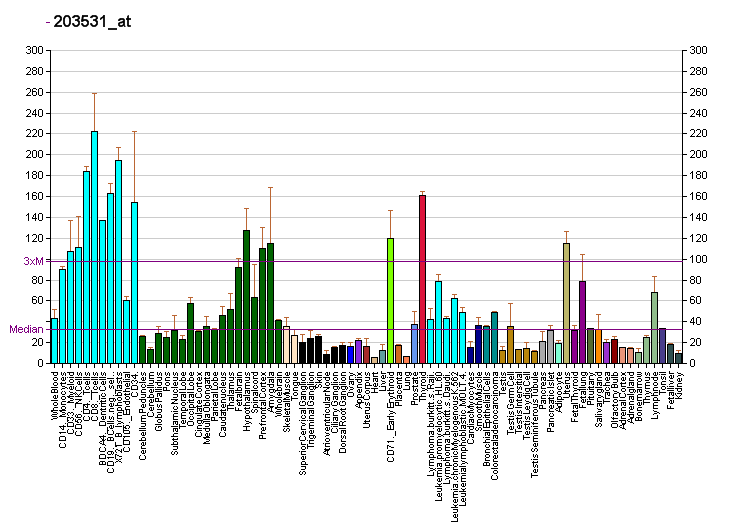

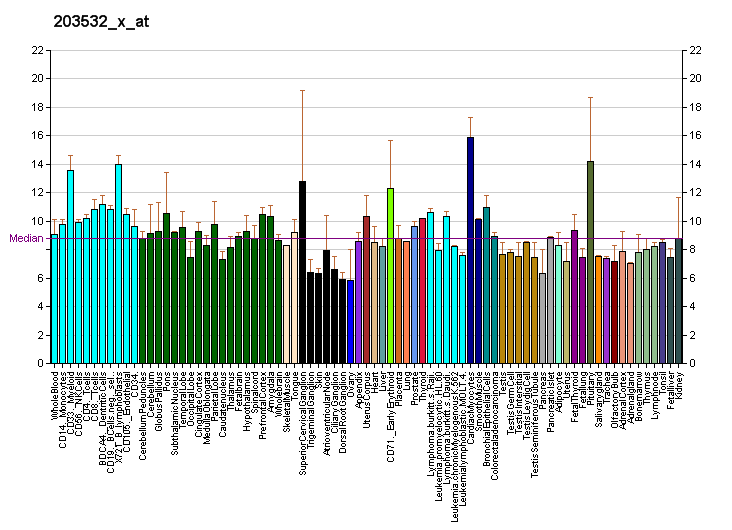
RNA expression pattern
Bgee	Human / Mouse (ortholog); Top expressed in: secondary oocyte; glutes; muscle of arm; biceps brachii; triceps brachii muscle; deltoid muscle; Skeletal muscle tissue of biceps brachii; Skeletal muscle tissue of rectus abdominis; thoracic diaphragm; Epithelium of choroid plexus / Top expressed in: Rostral migratory stream; morula; tail of embryo; zygote; spermatid; ascending aorta; aortic valve; spermatocyte; muscle of thigh; genital tubercle; More reference expression data
BioGPS	More reference expression data
Gene ontology
Molecular function	protein binding; ubiquitin protein ligase binding; ubiquitin protein ligase activity; calcium channel activity; ubiquitin-protein transferase activity; signaling receptor activity
Cellular component	cullin-RING ubiquitin ligase complex; cytosol; Cul5-RING ubiquitin ligase complex; Cul4-RING E3 ubiquitin ligase complex; SCF ubiquitin ligase complex
Biological process	intrinsic apoptotic signaling pathway; cell population proliferation; ubiquitin-dependent protein catabolic process; negative regulation of cell population proliferation; protein ubiquitination; viral process; ERBB2 signaling pathway; calcium ion transmembrane transport; cellular response to DNA damage stimulus; post-translational protein modification; G1/S transition of mitotic cell cycle; SCF-dependent proteasomal ubiquitin-dependent protein catabolic process; proteasome-mediated ubiquitin-dependent protein catabolic process
Sources:Amigo / QuickGO
Orthologs
Databases	NCBI: entry; OMA: entry
Species	Human	Mouse
Entrez	8065	75717
Ensembl	ENSG00000166266	ENSMUSG00000032030
UniProt	Q93034	Q9D5V5
RefSeq (mRNA)	NM_003478	NM_001161618; NM_027807
RefSeq (protein)	NP_003469	NP_001155090; NP_082083
Location (UCSC)	Chr 11: 108.01 – 108.11 Mb	Chr 9: 53.53 – 53.58 Mb
PubMed search
- Wikidata
View/Edit Human	View/Edit Mouse

Cullin-5 is a protein that in humans is encoded by the CUL5 gene.

== Discovery ==
The mammalian gene product was originally discovered by expression cloning, due to the protein's ability to mobilize intracellular calcium in response to the peptide hormone arginine vasopressin. It was first titled VACM-1, for vasopressin-activated, calcium-mobilizing receptor. Since then, VACM-1 has been shown to be homologous to the Cullin family of proteins, and was subsequently dubbed cul5.

== Tissue distribution ==
Studies have shown that the cul5 protein is expressed at its highest levels in heart and skeletal tissue, and is specifically expressed in vascular endothelium and renal collecting tubules.

== Function ==
Cul5 inhibits cellular proliferation, potentially through its involvement in the SOCS/ BC-box/ eloBC/ cul5/ RING E3 ligase complex, which functions as part of the ubiquitin system for protein degradation.

One study have shown that Cul5 plays a role in Reelin signaling cascade, participating in the DAB1 degradation and thus ensuring the negative feedback mechanism of Reelin signaling during corticogenesis.

== Interactions ==
CUL5 has been shown to interact with RBX1.
