= ANAPC2 =

Protein-coding gene in the species Homo sapiens

Identifiers
- Aliases: ANAPC2, APC2, anaphase promoting complex subunit 2
- External IDs: OMIM: 606946; MGI: 2139135; GeneCards: ANAPC2
Available structures
PDB	Ortholog search: PDBe RCSB
PDB	List of PDB id codes 4UI9, 4YII, 5A31, 5G05, 5G04

Gene location (Human)
Chr.	Chromosome 9 (human)
Band	9q34.3	Start	137,174,784 bp
Band	9q34.3	End	137,188,560 bp

Gene location (Mouse)
Chr.	Chromosome 2 (mouse)
Band	2|2 A3	Start	25,162,490 bp
Band	2|2 A3	End	25,175,927 bp
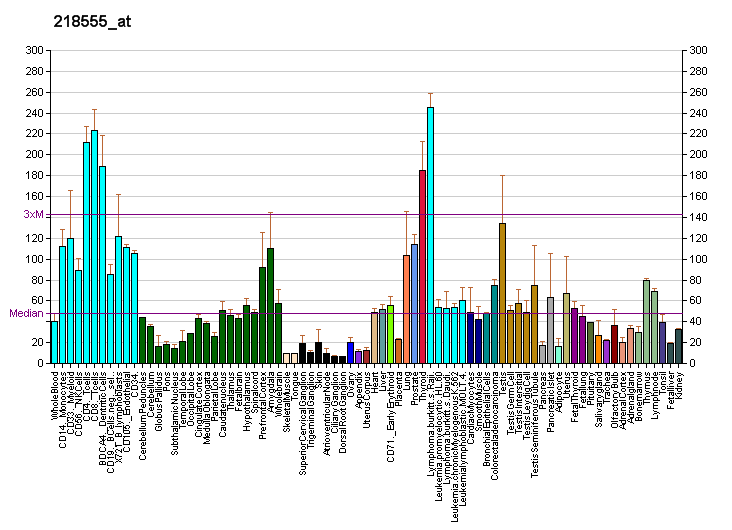
RNA expression pattern
Bgee	Human / Mouse (ortholog); Top expressed in: right uterine tube; right hemisphere of cerebellum; left testis; right testis; granulocyte; left ovary; right ovary; skin of leg; tibial nerve; skin of abdomen / Top expressed in: internal carotid artery; external carotid artery; ventricular zone; dermis; calvaria; vestibular membrane of cochlear duct; utricle; neural tube; efferent ductule; abdominal wall; More reference expression data
BioGPS	More reference expression data
Gene ontology
Molecular function	ubiquitin protein ligase activity; ubiquitin protein ligase binding; protein binding
Cellular component	cytosol; nucleoplasm; anaphase-promoting complex; nucleus
Biological process	cell differentiation; ubiquitin-dependent protein catabolic process; nervous system development; positive regulation of synaptic plasticity; protein K11-linked ubiquitination; cell division; positive regulation of synapse maturation; positive regulation of dendrite morphogenesis; protein ubiquitination; cell cycle; anaphase-promoting complex-dependent catabolic process; positive regulation of axon extension; regulation of mitotic cell cycle phase transition
Sources:Amigo / QuickGO
Orthologs
Databases	NCBI: entry; OMA: entry
Species	Human	Mouse
Entrez	29882	99152
Ensembl	ENSG00000176248	ENSMUSG00000026965
UniProt	Q9UJX6	Q8BZQ7
RefSeq (mRNA)	NM_013366	NM_175300
RefSeq (protein)	NP_037498	NP_780509
Location (UCSC)	Chr 9: 137.17 – 137.19 Mb	Chr 2: 25.16 – 25.18 Mb
PubMed search
- Wikidata
View/Edit Human	View/Edit Mouse

Anaphase-promoting complex subunit 2 is an enzyme that in humans is encoded by the ANAPC2 gene.

A large protein complex, termed the anaphase-promoting complex (APC), or the cyclosome, promotes metaphase-anaphase transition by ubiquitinating its specific substrates such as mitotic cyclins and anaphase inhibitor, which are subsequently degraded by the 26S proteasome. Biochemical studies have shown that the vertebrate APC contains eight subunits. The composition of the APC is highly conserved in organisms from yeast to humans. The product of this gene is a component of the complex and shares sequence similarity with a recently identified family of proteins called cullins, which may also be involved in ubiquitin-mediated degradation.

== Interactions ==
ANAPC2 has been shown to interact with ANAPC1 and ANAPC11.
