= SAP130 =

Protein-coding gene in humans

Identifiers
- Aliases: SAP130, Sin3A associated protein 130
- External IDs: OMIM: 609697; MGI: 1919782; HomoloGene: 11577; GeneCards: SAP130; OMA:SAP130 - orthologs

Gene location (Human)
Chr.	Chromosome 2 (human)
Band	2q14.3	Start	127,941,217 bp
Band	2q14.3	End	128,028,120 bp

Gene location (Mouse)
Chr.	Chromosome 18 (mouse)
Band	18|18 B1	Start	31,767,424 bp
Band	18|18 B1	End	31,856,114 bp
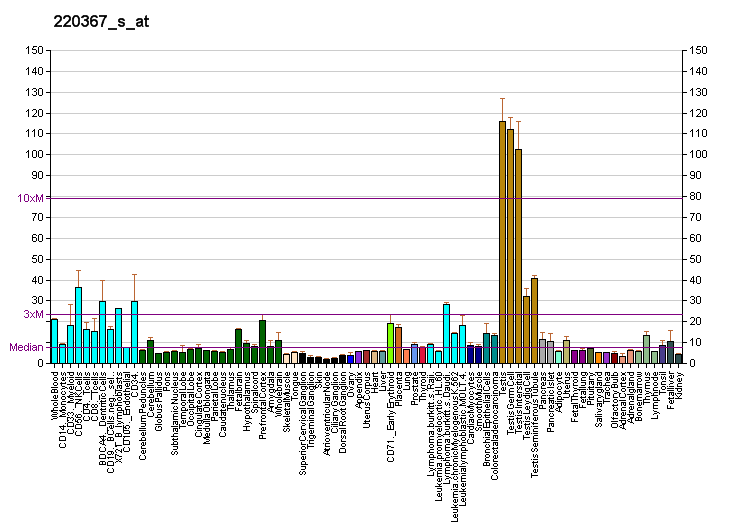
RNA expression pattern
Bgee	Human / Mouse (ortholog); Top expressed in: sperm; left testis; right testis; secondary oocyte; testicle; ventricular zone; ganglionic eminence; stromal cell of endometrium; gonad; popliteal artery / Top expressed in: zygote; tail of embryo; genital tubercle; secondary oocyte; primary oocyte; hand; yolk sac; otic vesicle; otolith organ; supraoptic nucleus; More reference expression data
BioGPS	More reference expression data
Gene ontology
Molecular function	transcription coactivator activity; histone acetyltransferase activity
Cellular component	nucleus; Sin3-type complex; nuclear speck
Biological process	regulation of transcription, DNA-templated; negative regulation of transcription by RNA polymerase II; transcription, DNA-templated
Sources:Amigo / QuickGO
Orthologs
Species	Human	Mouse
Entrez	79595	269003
Ensembl	ENSG00000136715	ENSMUSG00000024260
UniProt	Q9H0E3	Q8BIH0
RefSeq (mRNA)	NM_001145928; NM_024545; NM_001330299; NM_001330300; NM_001330301 NM_001330302; NM_001330303	NM_172965; NM_001357554; NM_001357555
RefSeq (protein)	NP_001139400; NP_001317228; NP_001317229; NP_001317230; NP_001317231 NP_001317232; NP_078821	NP_766553; NP_001344483; NP_001344484
Location (UCSC)	Chr 2: 127.94 – 128.03 Mb	Chr 18: 31.77 – 31.86 Mb
PubMed search
- Wikidata
View/Edit Human	View/Edit Mouse

Histone deacetylase complex subunit SAP130 is an enzyme that in humans is encoded by the SAP130 gene.

== Function ==
SAP130 is a subunit of the histone deacetylase (see HDAC1; MIM 601241)-dependent SIN3A (MIM 607776) corepressor complex (Fleischer et al., 2003).[supplied by OMIM]

== Interactions ==
SAP130 has been shown to interact with:

- CSN1S1,
- CUL2,
- Myc,
- SIN3A, and
- Von Hippel–Lindau tumor suppressor and
