= Cullin-9 =

Protein-coding gene in humans

CUL9

Identifiers
- Aliases: CUL9, H7AP1, PARC, 1810035I07Rik, Cul-9, mKIAA0708, cullin 9
- External IDs: OMIM: 607489; MGI: 1925559; GeneCards: CUL9
Available structures
PDB	Ortholog search: PDBe RCSB
PDB	List of PDB id codes 2JUF

Gene location (Human)
Chr.	Chromosome 6 (human)
Band	6p21.1	Start	43,182,184 bp
Band	6p21.1	End	43,224,587 bp

Gene location (Mouse)
Chr.	Chromosome 17 (mouse)
Band	17|17 C	Start	46,811,498 bp
Band	17|17 C	End	46,857,314 bp
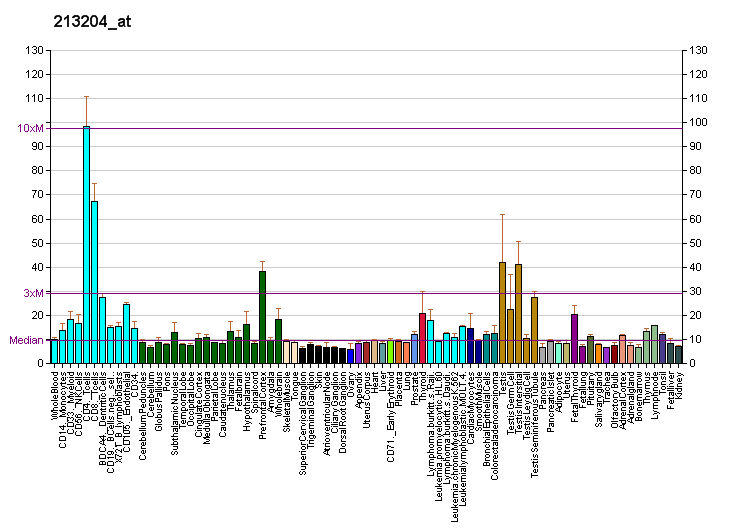

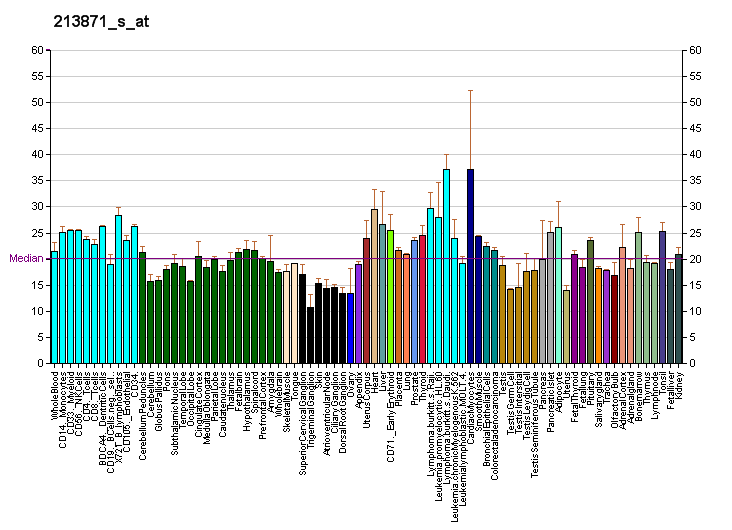
RNA expression pattern
Bgee	Human / Mouse (ortholog); Top expressed in: right testis; left testis; right frontal lobe; right hemisphere of cerebellum; anterior pituitary; granulocyte; right lobe of thyroid gland; skin of abdomen; skin of leg; spleen / Top expressed in: neural layer of retina; dentate gyrus of hippocampal formation granule cell; primary visual cortex; superior frontal gyrus; muscle of thigh; spermatocyte; right kidney; cerebellar cortex; proximal tubule; lumbar subsegment of spinal cord; More reference expression data
BioGPS	More reference expression data
Gene ontology
Molecular function	nucleotide binding; protein binding; ATP binding; ubiquitin protein ligase binding; metal ion binding; transferase activity
Cellular component	cytoplasm; cullin-RING ubiquitin ligase complex; cytosol
Biological process	microtubule cytoskeleton organization; ubiquitin-dependent protein catabolic process; regulation of mitotic nuclear division; protein ubiquitination; post-translational protein modification
Sources:Amigo / QuickGO
Orthologs
Databases	NCBI: entry; OMA: entry
Species	Human	Mouse
Entrez	23113	78309
Ensembl	ENSG00000112659	ENSMUSG00000040327
UniProt	Q8IWT3	Q80TT8
RefSeq (mRNA)	NM_015089	NM_001081335
RefSeq (protein)	NP_055904	n/a
Location (UCSC)	Chr 6: 43.18 – 43.22 Mb	Chr 17: 46.81 – 46.86 Mb
PubMed search
- Wikidata
View/Edit Human	View/Edit Mouse

Cullin-9 is a protein that in humans is encoded by the CUL9 gene.

== Interactions ==
PARC (gene) has been shown to interact with P53.
