= Cullin-2 =

Protein found in humans

CUL2

Identifiers
- Aliases: CUL2, cullin 2
- External IDs: OMIM: 603135; MGI: 1918995; GeneCards: CUL2
Available structures
PDB	Ortholog search: PDBe RCSB
PDB	List of PDB id codes 4WQO

Gene location (Human)
Chr.	Chromosome 10 (human)
Band	10p11.21	Start	35,008,504 bp
Band	10p11.21	End	35,127,006 bp

Gene location (Mouse)
Chr.	Chromosome 18 (mouse)
Band	18|18 A1	Start	3,382,988 bp
Band	18|18 A1	End	3,436,377 bp
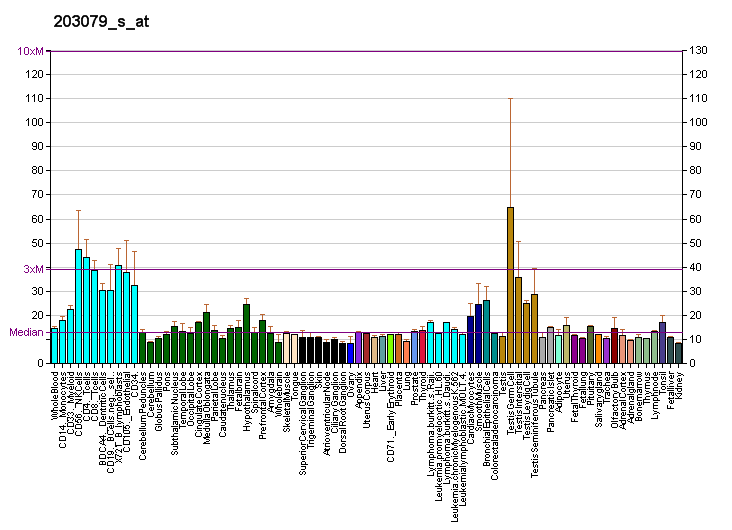

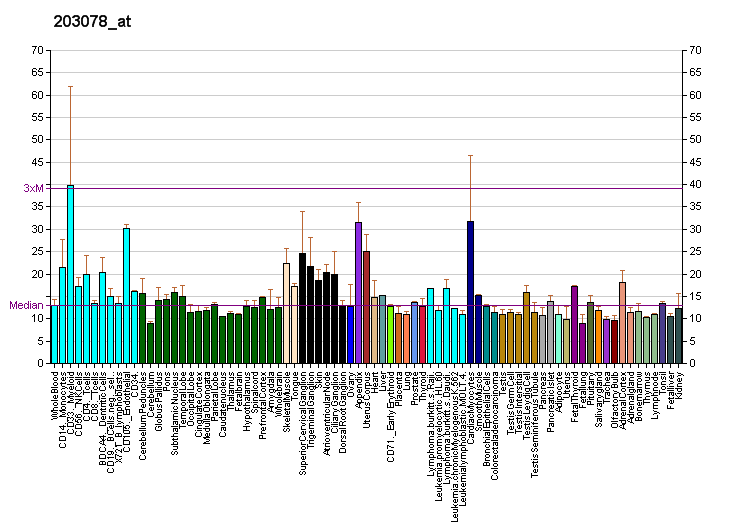
RNA expression pattern
Bgee	Human / Mouse (ortholog); Top expressed in: sperm; muscle of thigh; gastrocnemius muscle; gonad; Achilles tendon; ventricular zone; stromal cell of endometrium; islet of Langerhans; ganglionic eminence; biceps brachii / Top expressed in: superior cervical ganglion; epiblast; abdominal wall; facial motor nucleus; arcuate nucleus; ventromedial nucleus; paraventricular nucleus of hypothalamus; lateral hypothalamus; sternocleidomastoid muscle; neural tube; More reference expression data
BioGPS	More reference expression data
Gene ontology
Molecular function	protein binding; ubiquitin protein ligase activity; ubiquitin protein ligase binding; protein-containing complex binding
Cellular component	cullin-RING ubiquitin ligase complex; cytosol; nucleolus; VCB complex; nucleoplasm; Cul2-RING ubiquitin ligase complex; SCF ubiquitin ligase complex
Biological process	intrinsic apoptotic signaling pathway; viral process; protein catabolic process; regulation of transcription from RNA polymerase II promoter in response to hypoxia; negative regulation of cell population proliferation; ubiquitin-dependent protein catabolic process; post-translational protein modification; G1/S transition of mitotic cell cycle; protein ubiquitination; SCF-dependent proteasomal ubiquitin-dependent protein catabolic process; proteasome-mediated ubiquitin-dependent protein catabolic process
Sources:Amigo / QuickGO
Orthologs
Databases	NCBI: entry; OMA: entry
Species	Human	Mouse
Entrez	8453	71745
Ensembl	ENSG00000108094	ENSMUSG00000024231
UniProt	Q13617	Q9D4H8
RefSeq (mRNA)	NM_001198777; NM_001198778; NM_001198779; NM_003591; NM_001324375 NM_001324376	NM_029402; NM_001360829
RefSeq (protein)	NP_001185706; NP_001185707; NP_001185708; NP_001311304; NP_001311305 NP_003582	NP_083678; NP_001347758
Location (UCSC)	Chr 10: 35.01 – 35.13 Mb	Chr 18: 3.38 – 3.44 Mb
PubMed search
- Wikidata
View/Edit Human	View/Edit Mouse

Cullin-2 is a protein that in humans is encoded by the CUL2 gene.

== Interactions ==
CUL2 has been shown to interact with:

- CAND1,
- DCUN1D1,
- RBX1,
- SAP130,
- TCEB2 and
- Von Hippel-Lindau tumor suppressor.
