= Cullin-7 =

Protein found in humans

CUL7
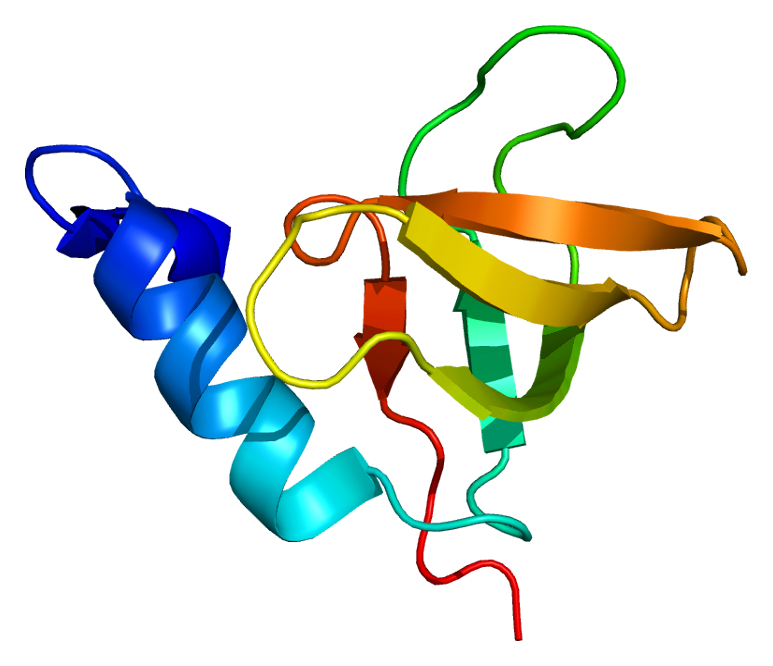

Identifiers
- Aliases: CUL7, 3M1, KIAA0076, dJ20C7.5, cullin 7, CUL-7
- External IDs: OMIM: 609577; MGI: 1913765; GeneCards: CUL7
Available structures
PDB	Ortholog search: PDBe RCSB
PDB	List of PDB id codes 2JNG

Gene location (Human)
Chr.	Chromosome 6 (human)
Band	6p21.1	Start	43,037,617 bp
Band	6p21.1	End	43,053,943 bp

Gene location (Mouse)
Chr.	Chromosome 17 (mouse)
Band	17|17 C	Start	46,961,263 bp
Band	17|17 C	End	46,975,290 bp
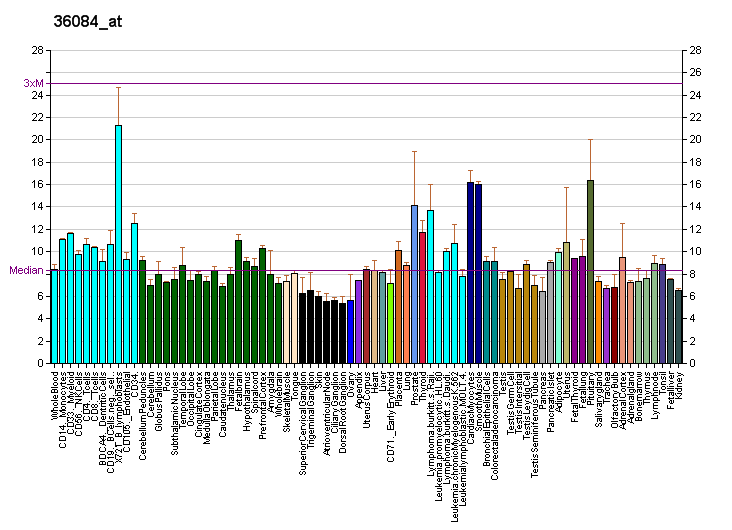

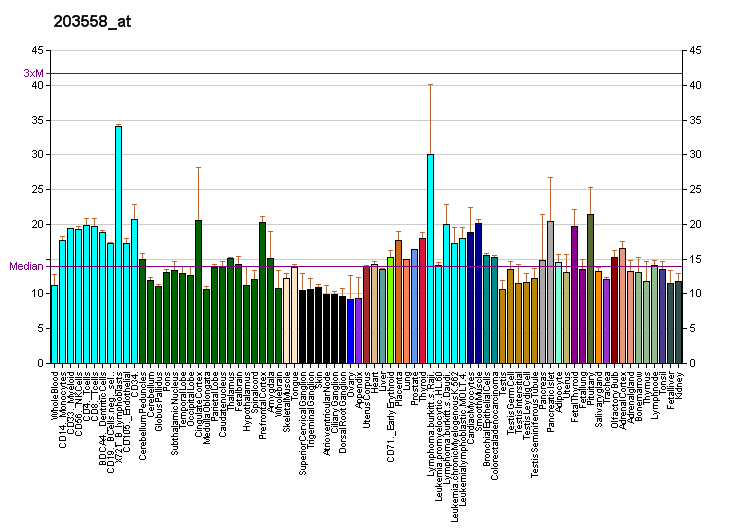
RNA expression pattern
Bgee	Human / Mouse (ortholog); Top expressed in: stromal cell of endometrium; pituitary gland; anterior pituitary; right uterine tube; right adrenal gland; right adrenal cortex; right lobe of thyroid gland; ventricular zone; right hemisphere of cerebellum; canal of the cervix / Top expressed in: saccule; yolk sac; otic vesicle; otic placode; umbilical cord; internal carotid artery; external carotid artery; human fetus; efferent ductule; molar; More reference expression data
BioGPS	More reference expression data
Gene ontology
Molecular function	protein binding; ubiquitin protein ligase binding
Cellular component	cytoplasm; cytosol; centrosome; Golgi apparatus; microtubule organizing center; Cul7-RING ubiquitin ligase complex; perinuclear region of cytoplasm; anaphase-promoting complex; 3M complex; cytoskeleton
Biological process	Golgi organization; ubiquitin-dependent protein catabolic process; placenta development; mitotic cytokinesis; proteolysis; vasculogenesis; IRE1-mediated unfolded protein response; positive regulation of dendrite morphogenesis; protein ubiquitination; epithelial to mesenchymal transition; viral process; microtubule cytoskeleton organization; regulation of mitotic nuclear division; post-translational protein modification
Sources:Amigo / QuickGO
Orthologs
Databases	NCBI: entry; OMA: entry
Species	Human	Mouse
Entrez	9820	66515
Ensembl	ENSG00000044090	ENSMUSG00000038545
UniProt	Q14999	Q8VE73
RefSeq (mRNA)	NM_001168370; NM_014780; NM_001374872; NM_001374873; NM_001374874	NM_025611
RefSeq (protein)	NP_001161842; NP_055595; NP_001361801; NP_001361802; NP_001361803	NP_079887
Location (UCSC)	Chr 6: 43.04 – 43.05 Mb	Chr 17: 46.96 – 46.98 Mb
PubMed search
- Wikidata
View/Edit Human	View/Edit Mouse

Cullin-7 is a RING-E3 ligase protein that in humans is encoded by the CUL7 gene.

== Clinical significance ==
It is associated with 3-M syndrome.

== Interactions ==
CUL7 has been shown to interact with RBX1.
