= SCF complex =

Type of protein

(a) SCF contains three core subunits—the RING protein Rbx1, the cullin Cul1, and Skp1. Rbx1 binds the E2–ubiquitin conjugate. The target protein binds to an F-box protein that is bound to the enzyme core via interactions with the Skp1 subunit. After binding of a target protein to the F-box protein, the ubiquitin is transferred from E2 and attached via a peptide bond to a lysine side chain in the target protein. (b) A composite model structure for human SCF derived from X-ray structures of human Rbx1–Cul1–Skp1–Skp2 complex and the E2 enzyme Ubc7. The target protein (not shown here) interacts with the F-box protein Skp2, which thereby positions the substrate for ubiquitination by the E2 enzyme. Ubiquitin is not shown in this model but at the start of the reaction it would be bound to the E2 enzyme at the active-site cysteine shown in blue. (Adapted from Zheng, N. et al.: Nature 2002, 416:703–709.) (PDB 1fbv, 1ldk, 1fqr)

Skp, Cullin, F-box containing complex (or SCF complex) is a multi-protein E3 ubiquitin ligase complex that catalyzes the ubiquitination of proteins destined for 26S proteasomal degradation. Along with the anaphase-promoting complex, SCF has important roles in the ubiquitination of proteins involved in the cell cycle. The SCF complex also marks various other cellular proteins for destruction.

== Core components ==
SCF contains a variable F-box protein and three core subunits:

- F-box protein (FBP) – FBP contributes to the substrate specificity of the SCF complex by first aggregating to target proteins independently of the complex. Each FBP (e.g. Skp2) may recognize several different substrates in a manner that is dependent on post-translational modifications such as phosphorylation or glycosylation. FBP then binds to Skp1 of the SCF complex using an F-box motif, bringing the target protein into proximity with the functional E2 ubiquitin-conjugating enzyme. FBP is also essential in regulating SCF activity during the course of the cell cycle. SCF levels are thought to remain constant throughout the cell-cycle. Instead, FBP affinity for protein substrates is regulated through cyclin-CDK-mediated phosphorylation of target proteins.
- Skp1 – Skp1 is an adaptor protein that is essential for the recognition and binding of F-box proteins.
- Cullin (CUL1) – Cullin forms the major structural scaffold of the SCF complex and links the skp1 domain to the Rbx1 domain. Different combinations of Cullin and FBPs can generate on the order of a hundred types of E3 ubiquitin ligases that target different substrates.
- RBX1 – Rbx1 contains a small, zinc-binding Really Interesting New Gene (RING) finger domain, to which the E2 ubiquitin-conjugating enzyme binds. This binding event allows the transferral of ubiquitin from E2 to a lysine residue on the target protein.

== Discovery ==
The first hint that led to the discovery of the SCF complex came from genetic screens of Saccharomyces cerevisiae, also known as budding yeast. Temperature-sensitive cell division cycle (Cdc) mutants—such as Cdc4, Cdc34, and Cdc53—arrested in G1 with unreplicated DNA and multiple elongated buds. The phenotype was attributed to a failure to degrade Sic1, an inhibitor of S cyclin-CDK complexes. These findings indicated that proteolysis is important in the G1/S transition.

Next, biochemical studies revealed that Cdc34 is an E2 enzyme that physically interacts with an E3 ubiquitin ligase complex containing Skp1, Cdc4, and several other proteins. Skp1's known binding partners—specifically Skp2, Cyclin F, and Cdc4—were found to share an approximately 40 residue motif that was coined the F-box motif. The F-box hypothesis that followed these discoveries proposed that F-box proteins recruit substrates targeted for degradation, and that Skp1 links the F-box protein to the core ubiquitination complex.

Subsequent genetic studies in Caenorhabditis elegans later contributed to the elucidation of other SCF complex components.

== Cell cycle regulation ==
The eukaryotic cell cycle is regulated through the synthesis, degradation, binding interactions, post-translational modifications of regulatory proteins. Of these regulatory proteins, two ubiquitin ligases are crucial for progression through cell cycle checkpoints. The anaphase-promoting complex (APC) controls the metaphase-anaphase transition, while the SCF complex controls G1/S and G2/M transitions. Specifically, SCF has been shown to regulate centriole splitting from late telophase to the G1/S transition.

SCF activity is largely regulated by post-translational modifications. For instance, ubiquitin-mediated autocatalytic degradation of FBPs is a mechanism of decreasing SCF activity.

Well-characterized cell cycle substrates of SCF complexes include:

- cyclin family proteins: Cyclin D, Cyclin E
- transcriptional regulators: Myc, E2f1, p130
- cyclin-dependent kinase inhibitors (CKIs): p27^{Kip1}, p21, Wee1
- centriole proteins: Cep250, Ninein

There are approximately seventy human FBPs, several of which are involved in cell cycle control as a component of SCF complexes.

Skp2 is an FBP that binds CKIs such as p27^{Kip1} and p21. Skp2 binds p27^{Kip1} only when two conditions are met: p27^{Kip1} is phosphorylated by E/A/CKD2 and bound to Cks1. As a consequence of binding Skp2, p27^{Kip1} is ubiquitinated and targeted for degradation in late G1 and early S. SCF-Skp2 also targets p130 for degradation in a phosphorylation dependent manner.

Beta-transducin repeat-containing protein (βTRCP) is an FBP that targets emi1—an APC/C-Cdh1 inhibitor—and wee1 for degradation during early mitosis. βTRCP recognizes these substrates after they are phosphorylated by Polo-like kinase 1 or Cyclin B-CDK1.

Fbw7, which is the human homolog of cdc4 in yeast, is an FBP that targets Cyclin E, Myc, Notch and c-Jun for degradation. Fbw7 is stable throughout the cell cycle and is localized to the nucleus due to the presence of a nuclear localization sequence (NLS). SCF-Fbw7 targets Sic1—when at least six out of nine possible sites are phosphorylated—and Swi5 for degradation. Since Sic1 normally prevents premature entry into S-phase by inhibiting Cyclin B-CDK1, targeting Sic1 for degradation promotes S-phase entry. Fbw7 is known to be a haplo-insufficient tumor suppressor gene implicated in several sporadic carcinomas, for which one mutant allele is enough to disturb the wild type phenotype.

Fbxo4 is another tumor suppressor FBP that has been implicated in human carcinomas. SCF-fbxo4 plays a role in cell cycle control by targeting cyclin D1 for degradation.

Cyclin F is an FBP that is associated with amyotrophic lateral sclerosis (ALS) and frontotemporal dementia (FTD). Mutations that prevent phosphorylation of Cyclin F alter the activity of SCF-Cyclin F, which likely affects downstream processes pertinent to neuron degeneration in ALS and FTD. Normally, Cyclin F targets E2f1 for degradation.

== Cancer ==
Recently, SCF complexes have become an attractive anti-cancer target because of their upregulation in some human cancers and their biochemically distinct active sites. Though many of the aforementioned FBPs have been implicated in cancer, cytotoxicity has been a limiting factor of drug development.

Skp2-targeting anti-sense oligonucleotides and siRNAs are in the drug development pipeline. Preliminary studies have shown that Skp2 downregulation can inhibit the growth of melanomas, lung cancer cells, oral cancer cells, and glioblastoma cells.

βTRCP-targeting siRNAs have been shown to sensitize breast cancer cells and cervical cancer cells to existing chemotherapies.

== Plant hormone signaling ==
The plant hormone auxin binds Tir1 (Transport Inhibitor Response 1). Tir1 is an Auxin Signaling F-box Protein (AFB) that acts as an auxin receptor. Auxin-bound Tir1 stimulates binding of SCF-Tir1 to the AUX/IAA repressor. Subsequent degradation of the repressor results in activation of AUX/IAA (i.e. auxin-responsive) genes.

The plant hormone Jasmonate binds Coi1, an FBP. SCF-Coi1 then binds the JAZ transcription factor and targets it for degradation. Degradation of the JAZ transcription factor allows for the transcription of the jasmonate responsive genes.
