= Cullin-1 =

Protein found in humans

CUL1
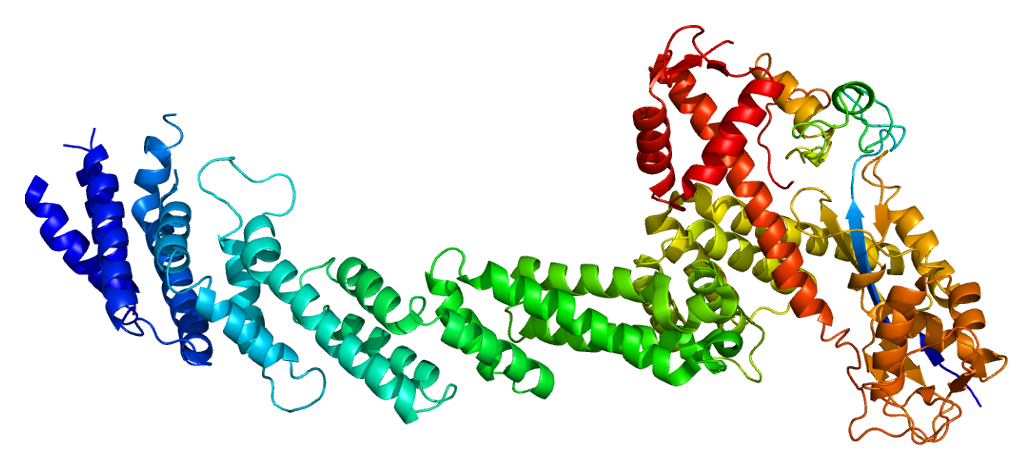

Identifiers
- Aliases: CUL1, cullin 1
- External IDs: OMIM: 603134; MGI: 1349658; GeneCards: CUL1
Available structures
PDB	Ortholog search: PDBe RCSB
PDB	List of PDB id codes 1LDJ, 1LDK, 1U6G, 3RTR, 3TDU, 3TDZ, 4F52, 4P5O

Gene location (Human)
Chr.	Chromosome 7 (human)
Band	7q36.1	Start	148,697,914 bp
Band	7q36.1	End	148,801,110 bp

Gene location (Mouse)
Chr.	Chromosome 6 (mouse)
Band	6|6 B2.3	Start	47,430,332 bp
Band	6|6 B2.3	End	47,503,073 bp
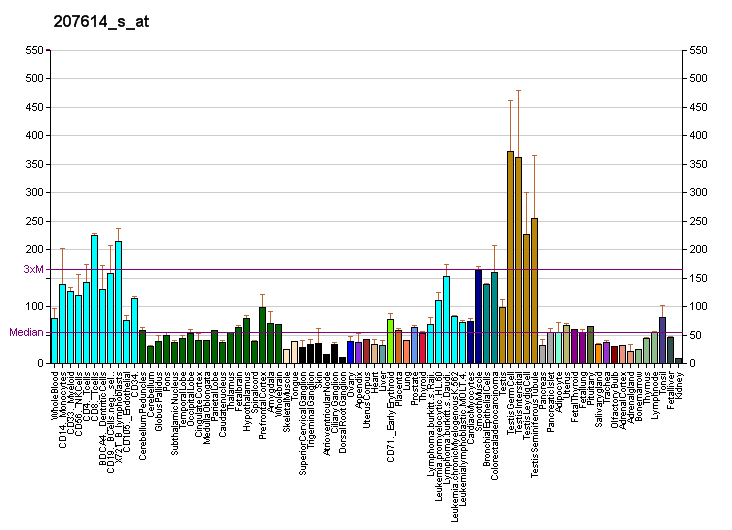
RNA expression pattern
Bgee	Human / Mouse (ortholog); Top expressed in: secondary oocyte; left testis; right testis; ganglionic eminence; sperm; gastrocnemius muscle; Achilles tendon; biceps brachii; ventricular zone; Skeletal muscle tissue of biceps brachii / Top expressed in: secondary oocyte; zygote; tail of embryo; genital tubercle; primary oocyte; ventricular zone; medullary collecting duct; spermatocyte; renal corpuscle; neural layer of retina; More reference expression data
BioGPS	More reference expression data
Gene ontology
Molecular function	protein binding; ubiquitin protein ligase binding; ubiquitin protein ligase activity; ubiquitin-protein transferase activity
Cellular component	Parkin-FBXW7-Cul1 ubiquitin ligase complex; nucleoplasm; cytosol; cullin-RING ubiquitin ligase complex; SCF ubiquitin ligase complex
Biological process	intrinsic apoptotic signaling pathway; viral process; G2/M transition of mitotic cell cycle; stress-activated MAPK cascade; ubiquitin-dependent protein catabolic process; protein monoubiquitination; cell population proliferation; negative regulation of cell population proliferation; animal organ morphogenesis; apoptotic process; NIK/NF-kappaB signaling; protein ubiquitination; protein polyubiquitination; Wnt signaling pathway; SCF complex assembly; negative regulation of G2/M transition of mitotic cell cycle; cellular iron ion homeostasis; post-translational protein modification; G1/S transition of mitotic cell cycle; interleukin-1-mediated signaling pathway; SCF-dependent proteasomal ubiquitin-dependent protein catabolic process; regulation of mitotic cell cycle phase transition; proteasome-mediated ubiquitin-dependent protein catabolic process; stimulatory C-type lectin receptor signaling pathway; Fc-epsilon receptor signaling pathway; T cell receptor signaling pathway
Sources:Amigo / QuickGO
Orthologs
Databases	NCBI: entry; OMA: entry
Species	Human	Mouse
Entrez	8454	26965
Ensembl	ENSG00000055130	ENSMUSG00000029686
UniProt	Q13616	Q9WTX6
RefSeq (mRNA)	NM_003592	NM_012042; NM_001355550; NM_001355551
RefSeq (protein)	NP_003583	NP_036172; NP_001342479; NP_001342480
Location (UCSC)	Chr 7: 148.7 – 148.8 Mb	Chr 6: 47.43 – 47.5 Mb
PubMed search
- Wikidata
View/Edit Human	View/Edit Mouse

Cullin-1, also known as CUL1, is a human protein and gene from cullin family. This protein plays an important role in protein degradation and protein ubiquitination.

This is an essential component of the SCF (SKP1-CUL1-F-box protein) E3 ubiquitin ligase complex, which mediates the ubiquitination of proteins involved in cell cycle progression, signal transduction and transcription. In the SCF complex, it serves as a rigid scaffold that organizes the SKP1-F-box protein and RBX1 subunits. May contribute to catalysis through positioning of the substrate and the ubiquitin-conjugating enzyme.

This protein is a part of a SCF complex consisting of CUL1, RBX1, SKP1 and SKP2. It also interacts with RNF7. Part of a complex with TIP120A/CAND1 and RBX1. The unneddylated form interacts with TIP120A/CAND1 and the interaction negatively regulates the association with SKP1 in the SCF complex. Interacts with COPS2.

It is expressed in lung fibroblasts.

The protein is neddylated, which enhances the ubiquitination activity of SCF. Deneddylated via its interaction with the COP9 signalosome (CSN) complex.
