= OBSL1 =

Protein-coding gene in the species Homo sapiens

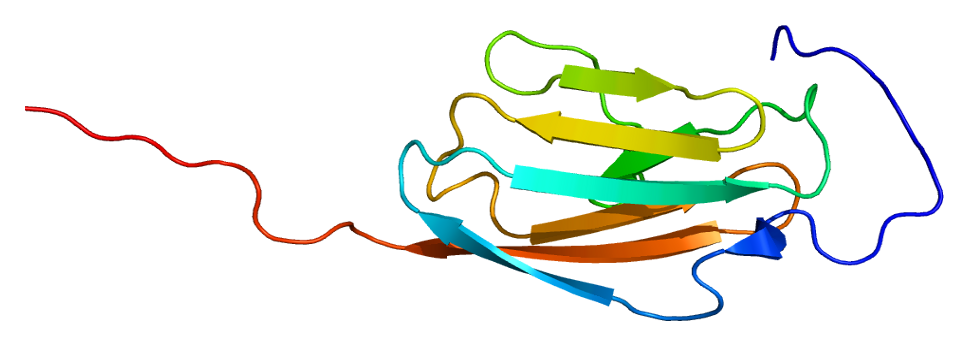

Identifiers
- Aliases: OBSL1, obscurin like 1, obscurin like cytoskeletal adaptor 1
- External IDs: OMIM: 610991; MGI: 2138628; GeneCards: OBSL1
Available structures
PDB	Ortholog search: PDBe RCSB
PDB	List of PDB id codes 2CPC, 2E6P, 2E6Q, 2LU7, 2LVC, 2WP3, 2WWK, 2WWM, 3KNB

Gene location (Human)
Chr.	Chromosome 2 (human)
Band	2q35	Start	219,550,728 bp
Band	2q35	End	219,571,859 bp

Gene location (Mouse)
Chr.	Chromosome 1 (mouse)
Band	1|1 C4	Start	75,455,954 bp
Band	1|1 C4	End	75,483,096 bp
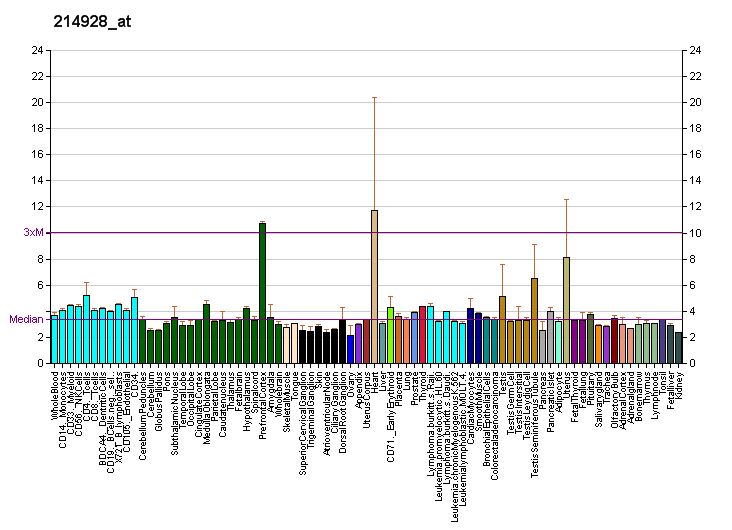

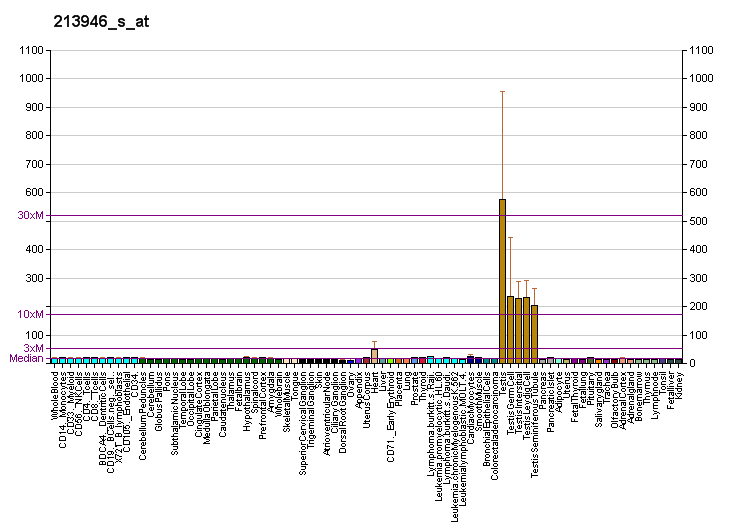

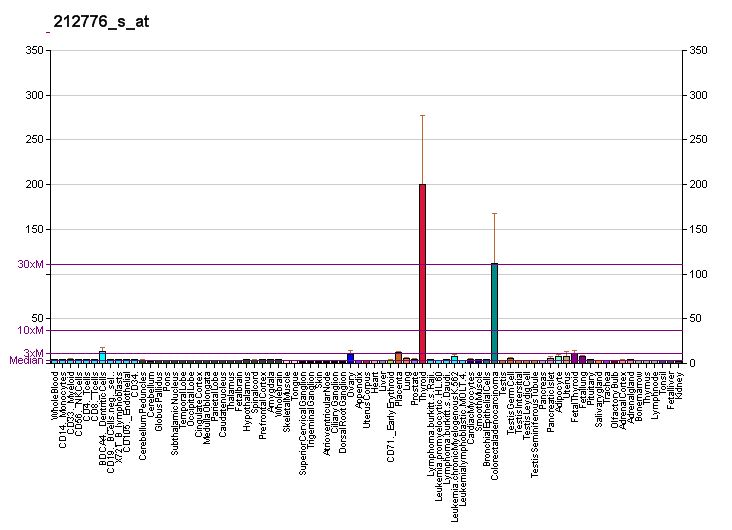
RNA expression pattern
Bgee	Human / Mouse (ortholog); Top expressed in: right testis; left testis; left ovary; right ovary; right lobe of thyroid gland; left lobe of thyroid gland; right adrenal cortex; right uterine tube; apex of heart; right hemisphere of cerebellum / Top expressed in: yolk sac; internal carotid artery; external carotid artery; fossa; muscle of thigh; condyle; vas deferens; renal corpuscle; genital tubercle; medullary collecting duct; More reference expression data
BioGPS	More reference expression data
Gene ontology
Molecular function	cytoskeletal anchor activity; protein binding; structural constituent of muscle; actin filament binding; muscle alpha-actinin binding; structural molecule activity conferring elasticity
Cellular component	Z discdkac; 3M complex; intercalated disc; M band; centrosome; microtubule organizing center; cytoskeleton; cytoplasm; Golgi apparatus; perinuclear region of cytoplasm; muscle myosin complex; cytosol; striated muscle thin filament; sarcomere
Biological process	protein localization to Golgi apparatus; cardiac myofibril assembly; microtubule cytoskeleton organization; cytoskeleton organization; regulation of mitotic nuclear division; positive regulation of dendrite morphogenesis; Golgi organization; striated muscle contraction; actin filament organization; sarcomere organization; striated muscle myosin thick filament assembly; post-translational protein modification; muscle contraction; skeletal muscle thin filament assembly; skeletal muscle myosin thick filament assembly; cardiac muscle tissue morphogenesis
Sources:Amigo / QuickGO
Orthologs
Databases	NCBI: entry; OMA: entry
Species	Human	Mouse
Entrez	23363	98733
Ensembl	ENSG00000124006	ENSMUSG00000026211
UniProt	O75147	D3YYU8
RefSeq (mRNA)	NM_001173408; NM_001173431; NM_015311	NM_178884; NM_001310679
RefSeq (protein)	NP_001166879; NP_001166902; NP_056126	NP_001297608; NP_849215; NP_001390042; NP_001390043
Location (UCSC)	Chr 2: 219.55 – 219.57 Mb	Chr 1: 75.46 – 75.48 Mb
PubMed search
- Wikidata
View/Edit Human	View/Edit Mouse

Obscurin-like protein 1 is a protein that in humans is encoded by the OBSL1 gene.
