= F-box/WD repeat-containing protein 1A =

Protein-coding gene in the species Homo sapiens

BTRC
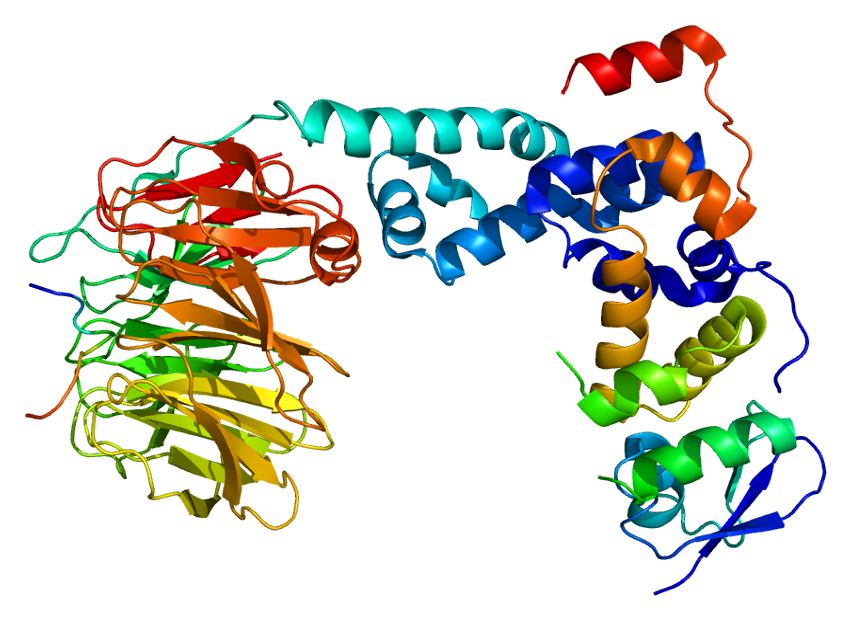

Identifiers
- Aliases: BTRC, BETA-TRCP, FBW1A, FBXW1, FBXW1A, FWD1, bTrCP, bTrCP1, betaTrCP, beta-transducin repeat containing E3 ubiquitin protein ligase
- External IDs: OMIM: 603482; MGI: 1338871; GeneCards: BTRC
Available structures
PDB	Ortholog search: PDBe RCSB
PDB	List of PDB id codes 1P22, 2P64

Gene location (Human)
Chr.	Chromosome 10 (human)
Band	10q24.32	Start	101,354,033 bp
Band	10q24.32	End	101,557,321 bp

Gene location (Mouse)
Chr.	Chromosome 19 (mouse)
Band	19|19 C3	Start	45,352,173 bp
Band	19|19 C3	End	45,518,452 bp
RNA expression pattern
Bgee	Human / Mouse (ortholog); Top expressed in: secondary oocyte; postcentral gyrus; superior frontal gyrus; entorhinal cortex; superior vestibular nucleus; lateral nuclear group of thalamus; pars compacta; prefrontal cortex; middle temporal gyrus; internal globus pallidus / Top expressed in: spermatocyte; spermatid; blastocyst; neural layer of retina; morula; seminiferous tubule; superior frontal gyrus; primary oocyte; dentate gyrus of hippocampal formation granule cell; zygote; More reference expression data
BioGPS	n/a
Gene ontology
Molecular function	protein binding; ligase activity; protein phosphorylated amino acid binding; protein dimerization activity; beta-catenin binding; ubiquitin protein ligase activity; ubiquitin-protein transferase activity; snoRNA binding
Cellular component	nucleus; cytoplasm; nucleoplasm; cytosol; SCF ubiquitin ligase complex; small-subunit processome; Pwp2p-containing subcomplex of 90S preribosome
Biological process	cellular response to organic cyclic compound; protein destabilization; regulation of cell cycle; protein catabolic process; G2/M transition of mitotic cell cycle; negative regulation of DNA-binding transcription factor activity; regulation of I-kappaB kinase/NF-kappaB signaling; stress-activated MAPK cascade; negative regulation of transcription, DNA-templated; positive regulation of proteolysis; regulation of proteasomal protein catabolic process; regulation of circadian rhythm; mammary gland epithelial cell proliferation; branching involved in mammary gland duct morphogenesis; negative regulation of smoothened signaling pathway; rhythmic process; NIK/NF-kappaB signaling; signal transduction; ubiquitin-dependent protein catabolic process; regulation of canonical Wnt signaling pathway; protein dephosphorylation; positive regulation of transcription, DNA-templated; protein ubiquitination; positive regulation of circadian rhythm; Wnt signaling pathway; protein polyubiquitination; viral process; post-translational protein modification; SCF-dependent proteasomal ubiquitin-dependent protein catabolic process; interleukin-1-mediated signaling pathway; proteasome-mediated ubiquitin-dependent protein catabolic process; maturation of SSU-rRNA from tricistronic rRNA transcript (SSU-rRNA, 5.8S rRNA, LSU-rRNA); regulation of mitotic cell cycle phase transition; stimulatory C-type lectin receptor signaling pathway; Fc-epsilon receptor signaling pathway; T cell receptor signaling pathway
Sources:Amigo / QuickGO
Orthologs
Databases	NCBI: entry; OMA: entry
Species	Human	Mouse
Entrez	8945	12234
Ensembl	ENSG00000166167	ENSMUSG00000025217
UniProt	Q9Y297; Q5T1W7	Q3ULA2
RefSeq (mRNA)	NM_001256856; NM_003939; NM_033637	NM_001037758; NM_001286465; NM_001286466; NM_009771; NM_001360120 NM_001360122; NM_001360124; NM_001360126; NM_001360127
RefSeq (protein)	NP_001243785; NP_003930; NP_378663	NP_001032847; NP_001273394; NP_001273395; NP_033901; NP_001347049 NP_001347051; NP_001347053; NP_001347055; NP_001347056
Location (UCSC)	Chr 10: 101.35 – 101.56 Mb	Chr 19: 45.35 – 45.52 Mb
PubMed search
- Wikidata
View/Edit Human	View/Edit Mouse

F-box/WD repeat-containing protein 1A (FBXW1A) also known as βTrCP1 or Fbxw1 or hsSlimb or pIkappaBalpha-E3 receptor subunit is a protein that in humans is encoded by the BTRC (beta-transducin repeat containing) gene.

This gene encodes a member of the F-box protein family which is characterized by an approximately 40 residue structural motif, the F-box. The F-box proteins constitute one of the four subunits of ubiquitin protein ligase complex called SCFs (Skp1-Cul1-F-box protein), which often, but not always, recognize substrates in a phosphorylation-dependent manner. F-box proteins are divided into 3 classes:

- Fbxws containing WD40 repeats,
- Fbxls containing leucine-rich repeats,
- and Fbxos containing either "other" protein–protein interaction modules or no recognizable motifs.

The protein encoded by this gene belongs to the Fbxw class as, in addition to an F-box, this protein contains multiple WD40 repeats. This protein is homologous to Xenopus βTrCP, yeast Met30, Neurospora Scon2 and Drosophila Slimb. In mammals, in addition to βTrCP1, a paralog protein (called βTrCP2 or FBXW11) also exists, but, so far, their functions appear redundant and indistinguishable.

== Discovery ==
Human βTrCP (referred to both βTrCP1 and βTrCP2) was originally identified as a cellular ubiquitin ligase that is bound by the HIV-1 Vpu viral protein to eliminate cellular CD4 by connecting it to the proteolytic machinery. Subsequently, βTrCP was shown to regulate multiple cellular processes by mediating the degradation of various targets. Cell cycle regulators constitute a major group of βTrCP substrates. During S phase, βTrCP keeps CDK1 in check by promoting the degradation of the phosphatase CDC25A, whereas in G2, βTrCP contributes to CDK1 activation by targeting the kinase WEE1 for degradation. In early mitosis, βTrCP mediates the degradation of EMI1, an inhibitor of the APC/C ubiquitin ligase complex, which is responsible for the anaphase-metaphase transition (by inducing the proteolysis of Securin) and mitotic exit (by driving the degradation of mitotic CDK1 activating cyclin subunits). Furthermore, βTrCP controls APC/C by targeting REST, thereby removing its transcriptional repression on MAD2, an essential component of the spindle assembly checkpoint that keeps APC/C inactive until all chromatids are attached to the spindle microtubules.

== Function ==
βTrCP plays important roles in regulating cell cycle checkpoints. In response to genotoxic stress, it contributes to turn off CDK1 activity by mediating the degradation of CDC25A in collaboration with Chk1, thereby preventing cell cycle progression before the completion of DNA repair. During recovery from DNA replication and DNA damage, βTrCP instead targets Claspin in a Plk1-dependent manner.

βTrCP has also emerged as an important player in protein translation, cell growth and survival. In response to mitogens, PDCD4, an inhibitor of the translation initiation factor eIF4A, is rapidly degraded in a βTrCP- and S6K1-dependent manner, allowing efficient protein translation and cell growth. Another target of βTrCP that is involved in protein translation is eEF2K, which inhibits translation elongation by phosphorylating eukaryotic Elongation Factor 2 (eEF2) and decreasing its affinity for the ribosome. βTrCP also cooperates with mTOR and CK1α to induce the degradation of DEPTOR (an mTOR inhibitor), thereby generating an auto-amplification loop to promote the full activation of mTOR. At the same time, βTrCP mediates the degradation of the pro-apoptotic protein BimEL to promote cell survival.

βTrCP also associates with phosphorylated IkappaBalpha and beta-catenin destruction motifs, probably functioning in multiple transcriptional programs by regulating the NF-kappaB and the WNT pathways. βTrCP has also been shown to regulate centriole disengagement and licensing. βTrCP target the intercentrosomal linker protein Cep68 in prometaphase, which contributes to centriole disengagement and subsequent centriole separation.

== Interactions ==
BTRC (gene) has been shown to interact with:

- β-catenin,
- BimEL1
- Cdc25A,
- CDC34,
- Claspin,
- CUL1,
- DEPTOR,
- DLG1,
- EMI1,
- FBXW11,
- IκBα,
- NFKB2,
- PDCD4,
- RELA,
- REST,
- SKP1A, and
- WEE1.
- C22orf25

== Clinical Significance ==
βTrCP behaves as an oncoprotein in some tissues. Elevated levels of βTrCP expression have been found in colorectal, pancreatic, hepatoblastoma, and breast cancers.
