= FBXW11 =

Protein-coding gene in the species Homo sapiens

Identifiers
- Aliases: FBXW11, BTRC2, BTRCP2, FBW1B, FBXW1B, Fbw11, Hos, F-box and WD repeat domain containing 11, NEDJED
- External IDs: OMIM: 605651; MGI: 2144023; GeneCards: FBXW11

Gene location (Human)
Chr.	Chromosome 5 (human)
Band	5q35.1	Start	171,861,549 bp
Band	5q35.1	End	172,006,873 bp

Gene location (Mouse)
Chr.	Chromosome 11 (mouse)
Band	11|11 A4	Start	32,592,724 bp
Band	11|11 A4	End	32,696,816 bp
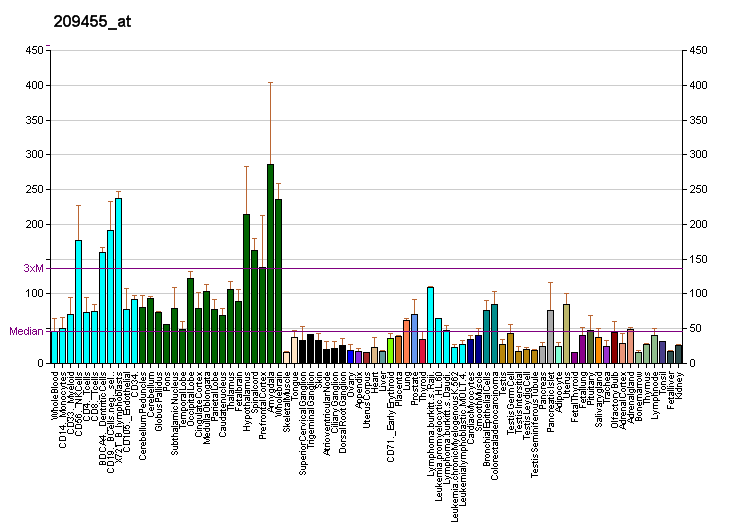

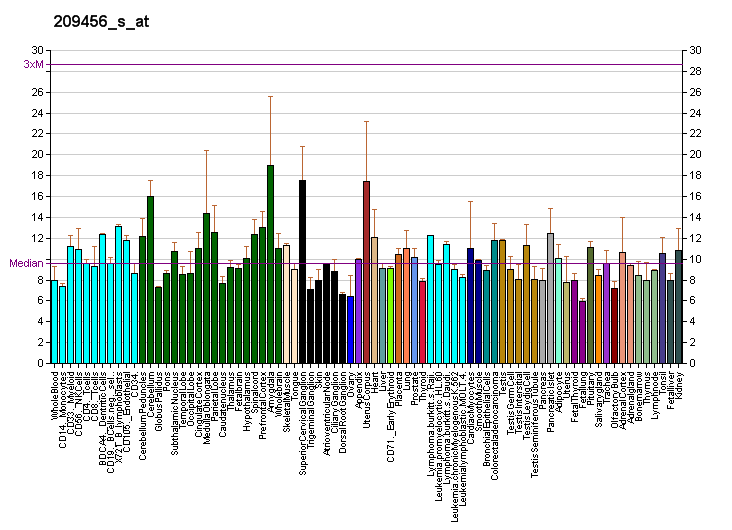
RNA expression pattern
Bgee	Human / Mouse (ortholog); Top expressed in: corpus callosum; internal globus pallidus; islet of Langerhans; subthalamic nucleus; Brodmann area 23; cartilage tissue; pars compacta; superior vestibular nucleus; cerebellar vermis; endothelial cell / Top expressed in: endocardial cushion; atrioventricular junction; atrioventricular valve; facial motor nucleus; Epithelium of choroid plexus; Rostral migratory stream; substantia nigra; left lung lobe; conjunctival fornix; cumulus cell; More reference expression data
BioGPS	More reference expression data
Gene ontology
Molecular function	protein dimerization activity; ubiquitin protein ligase activity; protein binding; ubiquitin-protein transferase activity
Cellular component	cytoplasm; SCF ubiquitin ligase complex; nucleus; centrosome; ubiquitin ligase complex; cytosol
Biological process	NIK/NF-kappaB signaling; Wnt signaling pathway; rhythmic process; cell cycle; SCF-dependent proteasomal ubiquitin-dependent protein catabolic process; G2/M transition of mitotic cell cycle; protein dephosphorylation; stress-activated MAPK cascade; protein destabilization; positive regulation of circadian rhythm; proteasome-mediated ubiquitin-dependent protein catabolic process; positive regulation of transcription, DNA-templated; protein ubiquitination; positive regulation of proteolysis; negative regulation of transcription, DNA-templated; protein polyubiquitination; post-translational protein modification; interleukin-1-mediated signaling pathway; negative regulation of NIK/NF-kappaB signaling; stimulatory C-type lectin receptor signaling pathway; Fc-epsilon receptor signaling pathway; T cell receptor signaling pathway
Sources:Amigo / QuickGO
Orthologs
Databases	NCBI: entry; OMA: entry
Species	Human	Mouse
Entrez	23291	103583
Ensembl	ENSG00000072803	ENSMUSG00000020271
UniProt	Q9UKB1	Q5SRY7
RefSeq (mRNA)	NM_012300; NM_033644; NM_033645; NM_001378974; NM_001378975 NM_001378976; NM_001378977; NM_001378978; NM_001378979; NM_001378980	NM_001271347; NM_001271348; NM_001271349; NM_134015; NM_001363353 NM_001363354; NM_001363355
RefSeq (protein)	NP_036432; NP_387448; NP_387449; NP_001365903; NP_001365904 NP_001365905; NP_001365906; NP_001365907; NP_001365908; NP_001365909	NP_001258276; NP_001258277; NP_001258278; NP_598776; NP_001350282 NP_001350283; NP_001350284
Location (UCSC)	Chr 5: 171.86 – 172.01 Mb	Chr 11: 32.59 – 32.7 Mb
PubMed search
- Wikidata
View/Edit Human	View/Edit Mouse

βTrCP2 (beta-transducin repeat containing protein 2; also known as Fbxw11 or HOS) is a protein that in humans is encoded by the FBXW11 (F-box and WD repeat domain containing 11) gene.

This gene encodes a member of the F-box protein family which is characterized by an approximately 40 residue structural motif, the F-box. The F-box proteins constitute one of the four subunits of ubiquitin protein ligase complex called SCFs (Skp1-Cul1-F-box protein), which often, but not always, recognize substrates in a phosphorylation-dependent manner. F-box proteins are divided into 3 classes:

- Fbxws containing WD40 repeats,
- Fbxls containing leucine-rich repeats,
- and Fbxos containing either "other" protein-protein interaction modules or no recognizable motifs.

The protein encoded by FBXW11 belongs to the Fbxw class as, in addition to an F-box, this protein contains multiple WD40 repeats. This protein is homologous to Xenopus βTrCP, yeast Met30, Neurospora Scon2 and Drosophila Slimb. In mammals, in addition to βTrCP2, a paralog protein (called βTrCP1 or FBXW1) also exists, but, so far, their functions appear redundant and indistinguishable.

== Discovery ==
Human βTrCP (referred to both βTrCP1 and βTrCP2) was originally identified as a cellular ubiquitin ligase that is bound by the HIV-1 Vpu viral protein to eliminate cellular CD4 by connecting it to the proteolytic machinery. Subsequently, βTrCP was shown to regulate multiple cellular processes by mediating the degradation of various targets. Cell cycle regulators constitute a major group of βTrCP substrates. During S phase, βTrCP keeps CDK1 in check by promoting the degradation of the phosphatase CDC25A, whereas in G2, βTrCP contributes to CDK1 activation by targeting the kinase WEE1 for degradation. In early mitosis, βTrCP mediates the degradation of EMI1, an inhibitor of the APC/C ubiquitin ligase complex, which is responsible for the anaphase-metaphase transition (by inducing the proteolysis of Securin) and mitotic exit (by driving the degradation of mitotic CDK1 activating cyclin subunits). Furthermore, βTrCP controls APC/C by targeting REST, thereby removing its transcriptional repression on MAD2, an essential component of the spindle assembly checkpoint that keeps APC/C inactive until all chromatids are attached to the spindle microtubules.

== Functions ==
βTrCP plays important roles in regulating cell cycle checkpoints. In response to genotoxic stress, it contributes to turn off CDK1 activity by mediating the degradation of CDC25A in collaboration with Chk1, thereby preventing cell cycle progression before the completion of DNA repair. During recovery from DNA replication and DNA damage, βTrCP instead targets Claspin in a Plk1-dependent manner.

βTrCP has also emerged as an important player in protein translation, cell growth and survival. In response to mitogens, PDCD4, an inhibitor of the translation initiation factor eIF4A, is rapidly degraded in a βTrCP- and S6K1-dependent manner, allowing efficient protein translation and cell growth. βTrCP also cooperates with mTOR and CK1α to induce the degradation of DEPTOR (an mTOR inhibitor), thereby generating an auto-amplification loop to promote the full activation of mTOR. At the same time, βTrCP mediates the degradation of the pro-apoptotic protein BimEL to promote cell survival.

βTrCP also associates with phosphorylated IkappaBalpha and beta-catenin destruction motifs, probably functioning in multiple transcriptional programs by regulating the NF-kappaB and the WNT pathways.

== Interactions ==
BTRC (gene) has been shown to interact with:

- FBXW11
- DLG1
- IκBα
- NFKB2
- RELA
- SKP1A
- CDC34
- CUL1
- β-catenin
- WEE1
- EMI1
- Cdc25A
- Claspin
- REST
- PDCD4
- DEPTOR

== Clinical significance ==
βTrCP behaves as an oncoprotein in some tissues. Elevated levels of βTrCP expression have been found in colorectal, pancreatic, hepatoblastoma, and breast cancers.
