= Early Mitotic Inhibitor 1 =

Cell cycle regulator

Early Mitotic Inhibitor 1 (EMI1) is an important cell cycle regulator which ensures timely mitotic entry by primarily inhibiting Anaphase-Promoting Complex/Cyclosome (APC/C) activity. This protein is present in many organisms including Xenopus, Zebrafish, Drosophila (homologous protein: Rca1), and Humans (also often known as F-box only protein 5 (FBXO5)). The findings illustrated here mainly focus on human EMI1, although it is likely that its function is conserved in other organisms.

== Discovery and Structure ==
Emi1 was first identified in a yeast two-hybrid screen searching for proteins that bind to the SCF subunit Skp1. Several studies using Cryo-Electron Microscopy (Cryo-EM) and Nuclear Magnetic Resonance (NMR) Spectroscopy have revealed the structure and domains of EMI1 in humans that are key to its function in the inhibition of APC/C activity.

=== N-terminal domain ===
The N-terminal domain of EMI1 primarily consists of 244 amino acid residues. The use of Cryo-EM and AlphaFold prediction suggests that the N-terminal domain of EMI1 comprises a KEN box that allows for its interaction with CDH1^{WD40}. Although a previous study that utilized an in vitro binding assay demonstrates that the N-terminal domain of EMI1 does not bind to APC/C, Höfler and colleagues propose that the binding of EMI1^{KEN} motif with CDH1^{WD40} enhances the affinity of EMI1 for APC/C^{CDH1} while preventing KEN-box dependent binding of substrates to APC/C.

=== F-box domain ===
The F-box domain, a motif with approximately 40 amino acids, is responsible for the binding of EMI1 to SKP1, a subunit of the SCF ubiquitin ligase complex.

=== C-terminal domain ===
The 143-residue C-terminal domain of EMI1 plays a critical role in its inhibitory function on APC/C. It contains intrinsically disordered D-box, Linker and Tail regions that are separated by a folded Zinc Binding Region (ZBR). Both the D-box and ZBR are essential for the inhibitory function of EMI1 on APC/C E3 ligase activity. The C-terminal RL tail of EMI1 is required for its binding and inhibition of APC/C. Furthermore, the C-terminal tail of EMI1 suppresses the activity of ubiquitin-conjugating enzyme E2S (Ube2S), preventing its binding to APC.

== Regulators of EMI1 ==
=== Positive regulation by E2F Transcription Factor ===
EMI1 expression level is found to oscillate during the cell cycle, peaking during the G1 phase and diminishing in early mitosis. E2F transcription factor, a key regulator of the G1-S transition of the cell cycle, drives the expression of EMI1 as suggested by the increase in EMI1 transcription upon activation of E2F.

=== Negative regulation by SCF^{βTrcp1}, Polo-like kinase 1 (PLK-1) and Cyclin-Dependent Kinases (CDKs) ===
EMI1 is a substrate of β-Trcp1. The phosphorylation of EMI1 by cdc2 and phosphorylation on the DSGxxS motif mediates its recognition by SCF^{βTrcp1} ubiquitin ligase, targeting EMI1 for destruction. EMI1 is phosphorylated at serine-145 and serine-149 in the DSGxxS motif by PLK-1. siRNA-mediated inhibition of PLK-1 results in the prevalence of EMI1 for a longer period and a delay in entry to mitosis while overexpression of PLK-1 reduces the expression of EMI1. At lower concentrations of PLK-1, CDK1 plays a costimulatory/synergistic effect of PLK-1 dependent βTrcp recruitment by EMI1. Another study shows that by phosphorylating EMI1 during mitosis, CDKs reduce the ability of EMI1 to bind and inhibit APC/C, providing an alternative regulatory mechanism of EMI1 apart from ubiquitin-mediated EMI1 degradation.

== Role of EMI1 in cell cycle progression ==
=== Inhibition of APC/C ===
EMI1 inhibits the activity of APC/C, a 1.2 MDa Ub ligase that plays a critical role in regulating the mitotic phase of the cell cycle by targeting mitotic regulators for degradation during mitotic exit. By inhibiting APC/C at the S and G2 phases of the cell cycle, EMI1 ensures a well-timed cell cycle progression and mitotic entry. EMI1 is believed to inhibit APC/C activity via multiple mechanisms executed by its various inhibitory domains.

EMI1 inhibits APC/C activity both by competitive inhibition of substrate binding to APC/C and by inhibiting ubiquitylation. The D-box of EMI1 inhibits the recruitment of APC/C substrates by competitively binding to the D-box receptor site of APC/C^{Cdh1}. The ZBR of EMI1 prevents ubiquitylation of APC/C substrates by inhibiting UBCH10-mediated ubiquitin chain assembly and UBCH5-mediated monoubiquitylation. The C-terminal tail of EMI1 blocks ubiquitin chain assembly by inhibiting ubiquitin-conjugating enzyme E2S (Ube2S) activity, preventing its binding to APC. Additionally, the C-terminal tail is involved in the recruitment of EMI1 to APC and the positioning of ZBR to block ubiquitin transfer.

EMI1 plays an important role in maintaining the integrity and tight regulation of the cell cycle. The inhibition of APC/C by EMI1 in S and G2 phases ensures the stabilization of two regulators that prevent rereplication, cyclin A and geminin, and therefore maintains genomic integrity. The importance of EMI1 in mitosis is further underscored in a study showcasing that failure of EMI1 degradation results in prometaphase block and mitotic catastrophe such as failure of chromosome congression and inhibition of cytokinesis.

=== Dual role of EMI1 ===
Apart from being an inhibitor of APC/C, EMI1 acts as a substrate of APC/C where it is degraded by APC/C^{Cdh1} in the G1 phase of the cell cycle. A model proposed by Cappell and colleagues suggests that EMI1 acts as a substrate at low concentrations and behaves as an inhibitor at concentrations higher than APC/C^{Cdh1}. The dual role of EMI1 creates an EMI1-APC/C^{Cdh1} dual-negative feedback system, creating a bistable hysteretic switch that is often a key feature of irreversible cell cycle commitment.

== Implications in cancer and therapy ==
Dysregulation in the expression of EMI1 has been implicated in various cancer types. EMI1 is overexpressed in many solid cancers of various organs such as the esophagus, lung, breast, liver, ovary and bone. In colorectal cancer, loss of EMI1 expression causes chromosome instability (CIN), increases DNA double-stranded break, and causes cellular transformation such as an increase in proliferation and anchorage-independent growth. Although these findings may seem conflicting, they suggest a possibility that EMI1 may play both an oncogenic and tumor-suppressive role in cancer. Regardless, ensuring a well-regulated EMI1 expression is important in cancer prevention.

Notably, various studies have suggested that regulation of EMI1 expression may enhance the effectiveness of various cancer therapies. Reducing EMI1 expression increases the sensitivity of cancer cells to ionizing radiation and anticancer agents such as doxorubicin and camptothecin. Conversely, reduction in EMI1 expression decreases the sensitivity of cancer cells to PARP inhibitor olaparib which is used to treat triple-negative breast cancer and thus, ensuring a sustained EMI1 expression is critical for effective cancer treatment. A follow-up study shows that in cases of low EMI1 expression in BRCA1-mutant cells, cytotoxic drug CHK1 inhibitor could restore sensitivity to PARP inhibitor.
