= (Skp1-protein)-hydroxyproline N-acetylglucosaminyltransferase =

Enzyme

Identifiers
- EC no.: 2.4.1.229

Databases
- IntEnz: IntEnz view
- BRENDA: BRENDA entry
- ExPASy: NiceZyme view
- KEGG: KEGG entry
- MetaCyc: metabolic pathway
- PRIAM: profile
- PDB structures: RCSB PDB PDBe PDBsum
Search
- PMC: articles
- PubMed: articles
- NCBI: proteins

In enzymology, a [Skp1-protein]-hydroxyproline N-acetylglucosaminyltransferase (EC 2.4.1.229) is an enzyme that catalyzes the chemical reaction

UDP-N-acetylglucosamine + [Skp_{1}-protein]-hydroxyproline $\rightleftharpoons$ UDP + [Skp_{1}-protein]-O-(N-acetyl-D-glucosaminyl)hydroxyproline

Thus, the two substrates of this enzyme are UDP-N-acetylglucosamine and Skp1-protein-hydroxyproline, whereas its two products are UDP and Skp1-protein-O-(N-acetyl-D-glucosaminyl)hydroxyproline.

This enzyme belongs to the family of glycosyltransferases, specifically the hexosyltransferases. The systematic name of this enzyme class is UDP-N-acetyl-D-glucosamine:[Skp1-protein]-hydroxyproline N-acetyl-D-glucosaminyl-transferase. Other names in common use include Skp1-HyPro GlcNAc-transferase, UDP-N-acetylglucosamine (GlcNAc):hydroxyproline polypeptide, GlcNAc-transferase, UDP-GlcNAc:Skp1-hydroxyproline GlcNAc-transferase, and UDP-GlcNAc:hydroxyproline polypeptide GlcNAc-transferase.
