= BIT225 =

Names
- IUPAC name N-Carbamimidoyl-5-(1-methyl-1H-pyrazol-4-yl)-2-naphthamide
- Other names BIT-225

Identifiers
| CAS Number | 917909-71-8 |
| 3D model (JSmol) | Interactive image |
| ChemSpider | 10176885 |
| PubChem CID | 12004418 |
| UNII | M9C27TI12U |
| CompTox Dashboard (EPA) | DTXSID401031931 |
- InChI: InChI=1S/C16H15N5O/c1-21-9-12(8-19-21)13-4-2-3-10-7-11(5-6-14(10)13)15(22)20-16(17)18/h2-9H,1H3,(H4,17,18,20,22) Key: WVROWPPEIMRGAB-UHFFFAOYSA-N; InChI=1/C16H15N5O/c1-21-9-12(8-19-21)13-4-2-3-10-7-11(5-6-14(10)13)15(22)20-16(17)18/h2-9H,1H3,(H4,17,18,20,22) Key: WVROWPPEIMRGAB-UHFFFAOYAP
- SMILES: CN1C=C(C=N1)C2=CC=CC3=C2C=CC(=C3)C(=O)NC(=N)N

Properties
| Chemical formula | C_{16}H_{15}N_{5}O |
| Molar mass | 293.330 g·mol^{−1} |
- Except where otherwise noted, data are given for materials in their standard state (at 25 °C [77 °F], 100 kPa). Infobox references

BIT225 is an experimental drug candidate under development by Biotron Limited for use in the treatment of both HIV and hepatitis C infection. By blocking Vpu ion channel activity, it disrupts HIV assembly within host monocyte cells; its method of action is a first for HIV drugs. Because it targets replication in monocyte derived macrophages, it offers promise for treatment of viral reservoirs that are unaffected by standard treatments. The activity of BIT225 is post-virus integration, with no direct effects on the HIV enzymes reverse transcriptase and protease. Since Vpu ion channel activity is highly conserved, the virus is unlikely to become resistant via generation of Vpu ion-independent virus. In addition, the drug also has been credited with curing hepatitis C after 12 weeks of treatment.
