= FBXO7 =

Protein-coding gene in the species Homo sapiens

Identifiers
- Aliases: FBXO7, FBX, FBX07, FBX7, PARK15, PKPS, F-box protein 7
- External IDs: OMIM: 605648; MGI: 1917004; GeneCards: FBXO7
Available structures
| PDB | Ortholog search: PDBe RCSB |
| PDB | List of PDB id codes 4L9C, 4L9H |

Gene location (Human)
| Chr. | Chromosome 22 (human) |
| Band | 22q12.3 | Start | 32,474,676 bp |
| Band | 22q12.3 | End | 32,498,829 bp |

Gene location (Mouse)
| Chr. | Chromosome 10 (mouse) |
| Band | 10|10 C1 | Start | 85,857,836 bp |
| Band | 10|10 C1 | End | 85,887,737 bp |
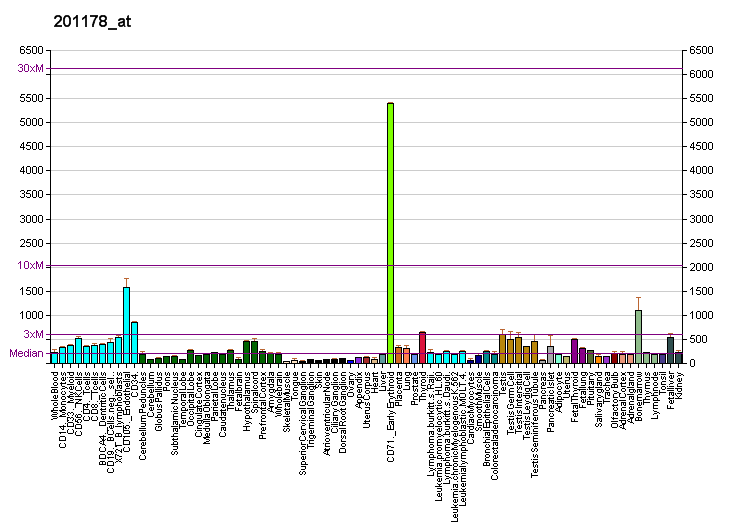
RNA expression pattern
| Bgee | Human / Mouse (ortholog); Top expressed in: trabecular bone; blood; sperm; corpus callosum; bone marrow; left lobe of thyroid gland; right testis; middle frontal gyrus; C1 segment; left testis / Top expressed in: right kidney; otolith organ; utricle; blood; spermatocyte; proximal tubule; human kidney; sciatic nerve; hand; bone marrow; More reference expression data |
| BioGPS | More reference expression data |
Gene ontology
| Molecular function | protein binding; ubiquitin-protein transferase activity; protein kinase binding; ubiquitin protein ligase binding; ubiquitin binding; protein heterodimerization activity |
| Cellular component | cytoplasm; ubiquitin ligase complex; mitochondrion; nucleus; cytosol; SCF ubiquitin ligase complex; glial cytoplasmic inclusion; classical Lewy body; Lewy neurite; Lewy body core; Lewy body corona; protein-containing complex |
| Biological process | negative regulation of G1/S transition of mitotic cell cycle; protein targeting to mitochondrion; negative regulation of lymphocyte differentiation; autophagy of mitochondrion; regulation of protein stability; negative regulation of cyclin-dependent protein serine/threonine kinase activity; regulation of locomotion; protein polyubiquitination; regulation of neuron projection development; protein ubiquitination; negative regulation of oxidative stress-induced neuron death; negative regulation of neuron death; positive regulation of autophagy of mitochondrion; negative regulation of hydrogen peroxide-induced neuron death; post-translational protein modification; ubiquitin-dependent protein catabolic process |
Sources:Amigo / QuickGO
Orthologs
| Databases | NCBI: entry; OMA: entry |
| Species | Human | Mouse |
| Entrez | 25793 | 69754 |
| Ensembl | ENSG00000100225 | ENSMUSG00000001786 |
| UniProt | Q9Y3I1 | Q3U7U3 |
| RefSeq (mRNA) | NM_001033024; NM_001257990; NM_012179 | NM_153195; NM_001310745; NM_001347151 |
| RefSeq (protein) | NP_001028196; NP_001244919; NP_036311 | NP_001297674; NP_001334080; NP_694875 |
| Location (UCSC) | Chr 22: 32.47 – 32.5 Mb | Chr 10: 85.86 – 85.89 Mb |
| PubMed search |
- Wikidata
| View/Edit Human | View/Edit Mouse |

F-box only protein 7 is a protein that in humans is encoded by the FBXO7 gene. Mutations in FBXO7 have been associated with Parkinson's disease.

== Function ==
This gene encodes a member of the F-box protein family which is characterized by an approximately 40 amino acid motif, the F-box. The F-box proteins constitute one of the four subunits of the ubiquitin protein ligase complex called SCFs (SKP1-cullin-F-box), which function in phosphorylation-dependent ubiquitination. The F-box proteins are divided into 3 classes: Fbws containing WD-40 domains, Fbls containing leucine-rich repeats, and Fbxs containing either different protein-protein interaction modules or no recognizable motifs. The protein encoded by this gene belongs to the Fbxs class and it may play a role in regulation of hematopoiesis. Alternatively spliced transcript variants of this gene have been identified with the full-length natures of only some variants being determined.

== Interactions ==
FBXO7 has been shown to interact with SKP1A, CUL1, CDK6, p27, PI31, Parkin, and PINK1.
