= FBXO4 =

Protein-coding gene in the species Homo sapiens

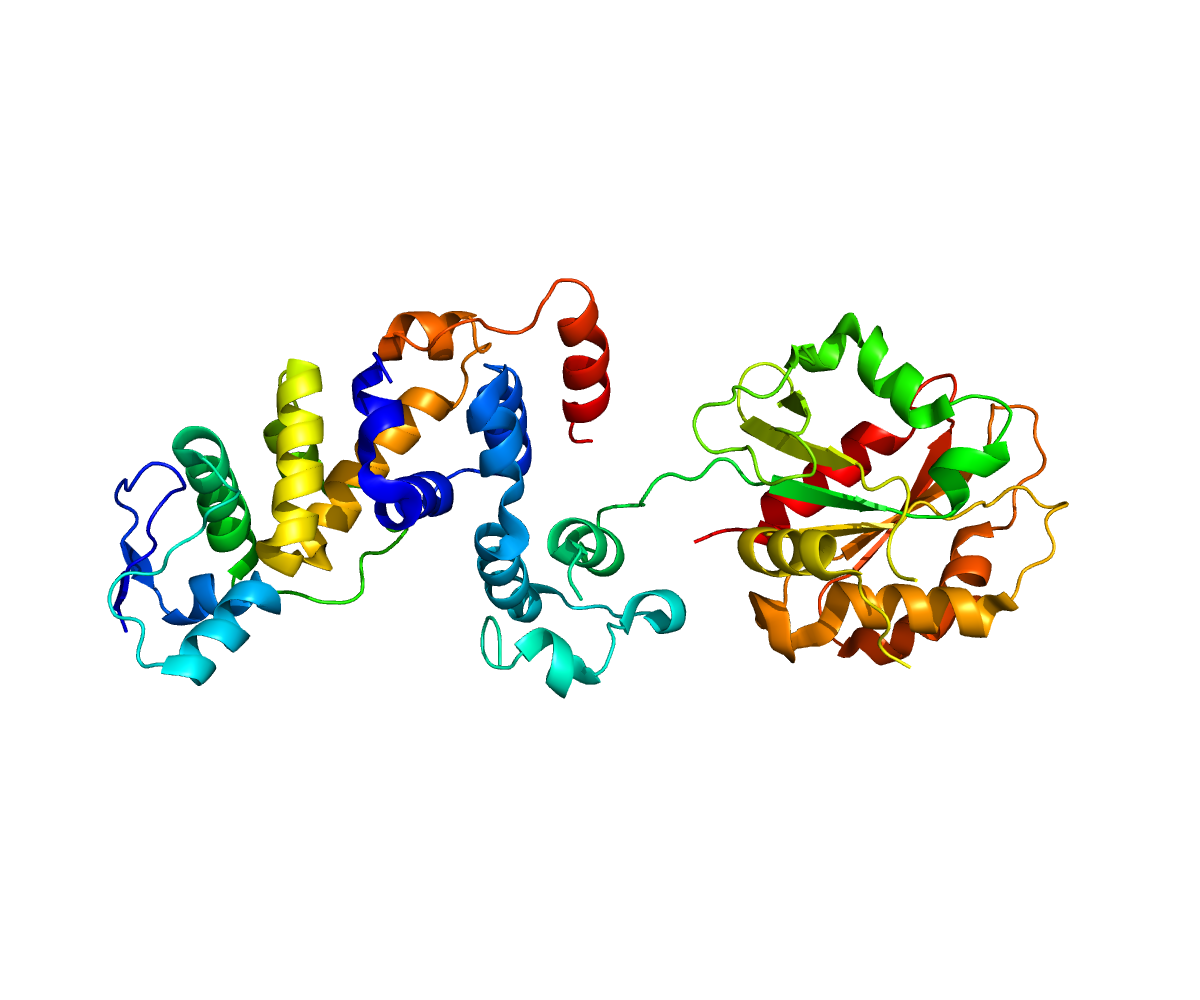

Identifiers
- Aliases: FBXO4, FBX4, F-box protein 4
- External IDs: OMIM: 609090; MGI: 2146220; GeneCards: FBXO4
Available structures
PDB	Ortholog search: PDBe RCSB
PDB	List of PDB id codes 3L2O, 3L82

Gene location (Human)
Chr.	Chromosome 5 (human)
Band	5p13.1	Start	41,925,254 bp
Band	5p13.1	End	41,941,743 bp

Gene location (Mouse)
Chr.	Chromosome 15 (mouse)
Band	15|15 A1	Start	3,994,927 bp
Band	15|15 A1	End	4,009,055 bp
RNA expression pattern
Bgee	Human / Mouse (ortholog); Top expressed in: Achilles tendon; body of pancreas; testicle; gastric mucosa; right uterine tube; skin of arm; tibial nerve; right lobe of thyroid gland; right lobe of liver; left lobe of thyroid gland / Top expressed in: saccule; ciliary body; proximal tubule; otic vesicle; right kidney; subcutaneous adipose tissue; white adipose tissue; spermatocyte; duodenum; calvaria; More reference expression data
BioGPS	n/a
Gene ontology
Molecular function	protein binding; protein homodimerization activity; ubiquitin protein ligase activity; ubiquitin-protein transferase activity
Cellular component	ubiquitin ligase complex; cytosol; SCF ubiquitin ligase complex; cytoplasm
Biological process	SCF-dependent proteasomal ubiquitin-dependent protein catabolic process; telomere maintenance; positive regulation of protein ubiquitination; ubiquitin-dependent protein catabolic process; protein polyubiquitination; common myeloid progenitor cell proliferation; protein destabilization; positive regulation of protein polyubiquitination; ageing; negative regulation of fibroblast proliferation; cellular response to ionizing radiation; cellular homeostasis; regulation of DNA damage checkpoint; negative regulation of protein localization to nucleus; posttranscriptional regulation of gene expression; protein ubiquitination; regulation of protein stability; positive regulation of telomere maintenance via telomerase; post-translational protein modification
Sources:Amigo / QuickGO
Orthologs
Databases	NCBI: entry; OMA: entry
Species	Human	Mouse
Entrez	26272	106052
Ensembl	ENSG00000151876	ENSMUSG00000022184
UniProt	Q9UKT5	Q8CHQ0
RefSeq (mRNA)	NM_001297437; NM_012176; NM_033484	NM_134099
RefSeq (protein)	NP_001284366; NP_036308; NP_277019	NP_598860
Location (UCSC)	Chr 5: 41.93 – 41.94 Mb	Chr 15: 3.99 – 4.01 Mb
PubMed search
- Wikidata
View/Edit Human	View/Edit Mouse

F-box only protein 4 is a protein that in humans is encoded by the FBXO4 gene.

== Function ==
This gene encodes a member of the F-box protein family which is characterized by an approximately 40 amino acid motif, the F-box. The F-box proteins constitute one of the four subunits of the ubiquitin ligase complex called SCFs (SKP1-cullin-F-box), which function in phosphorylation-dependent ubiquitination. The F-box proteins are divided into 3 classes: Fbws containing WD-40 domains, Fbls containing leucine-rich repeats, and Fbxs containing either different protein-protein interaction modules or no recognizable motifs. The protein encoded by this gene belongs to the Fbxs class. Alternative splicing of this gene generates 2 transcript variants.

== Interactions ==
FBXO4 has been shown to interact with:

- CUL1, and
- SKP1A.
