= CDCA3 =

Protein-coding gene in the species Homo sapiens

Identifiers
- Aliases: CDCA3, GRCC8, TOME-1, cell division cycle associated 3, TOME1
- External IDs: OMIM: 607749; MGI: 1315198; GeneCards: CDCA3

Gene location (Human)
| Chr. | Chromosome 12 (human) |
| Band | 12p13.31 | Start | 6,844,793 bp |
| Band | 12p13.31 | End | 6,851,292 bp |

Gene location (Mouse)
| Chr. | Chromosome 6 (mouse) |
| Band | 6 F2|6 59.17 cM | Start | 124,806,510 bp |
| Band | 6 F2|6 59.17 cM | End | 124,810,664 bp |
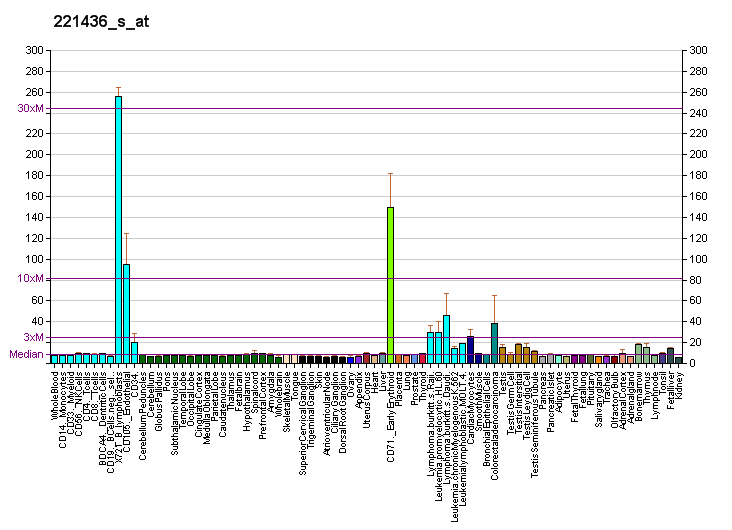
RNA expression pattern
| Bgee | Human / Mouse (ortholog); Top expressed in: ventricular zone; oocyte; secondary oocyte; gonad; left testis; right testis; ganglionic eminence; duodenum; jejunal mucosa; mucosa of transverse colon / Top expressed in: ventricular zone; fetal liver hematopoietic progenitor cell; medial ganglionic eminence; genital tubercle; tibiofemoral joint; spermatid; tail of embryo; seminiferous tubule; spermatocyte; abdominal wall; More reference expression data |
| BioGPS | More reference expression data |
Gene ontology
| Molecular function | protein binding |
| Cellular component | cytosol; cytoplasm |
| Biological process | cell division; cell cycle; protein ubiquitination; biological process |
Sources:Amigo / QuickGO
Orthologs
| Databases | NCBI: entry; OMA: entry |
| Species | Human | Mouse |
| Entrez | 83461 | 14793 |
| Ensembl | ENSG00000111665 | ENSMUSG00000023505 |
| UniProt | Q99618 | Q99M54 |
| RefSeq (mRNA) | NM_001297602; NM_001297603; NM_001297604; NM_031299; NM_001331019 | NM_013538 |
| RefSeq (protein) | NP_001284531; NP_001284532; NP_001284533; NP_001317948; NP_112589 | NP_038566 |
| Location (UCSC) | Chr 12: 6.84 – 6.85 Mb | Chr 6: 124.81 – 124.81 Mb |
| PubMed search |
- Wikidata
| View/Edit Human | View/Edit Mouse |

Cell division cycle-associated protein 3 is a protein that in humans is encoded by the CDCA3 gene.

== Interactions ==
CDCA3 has been shown to interact with SKP1A.
