= Tetherin =

Mammalian protein found in Homo sapiens

BST2
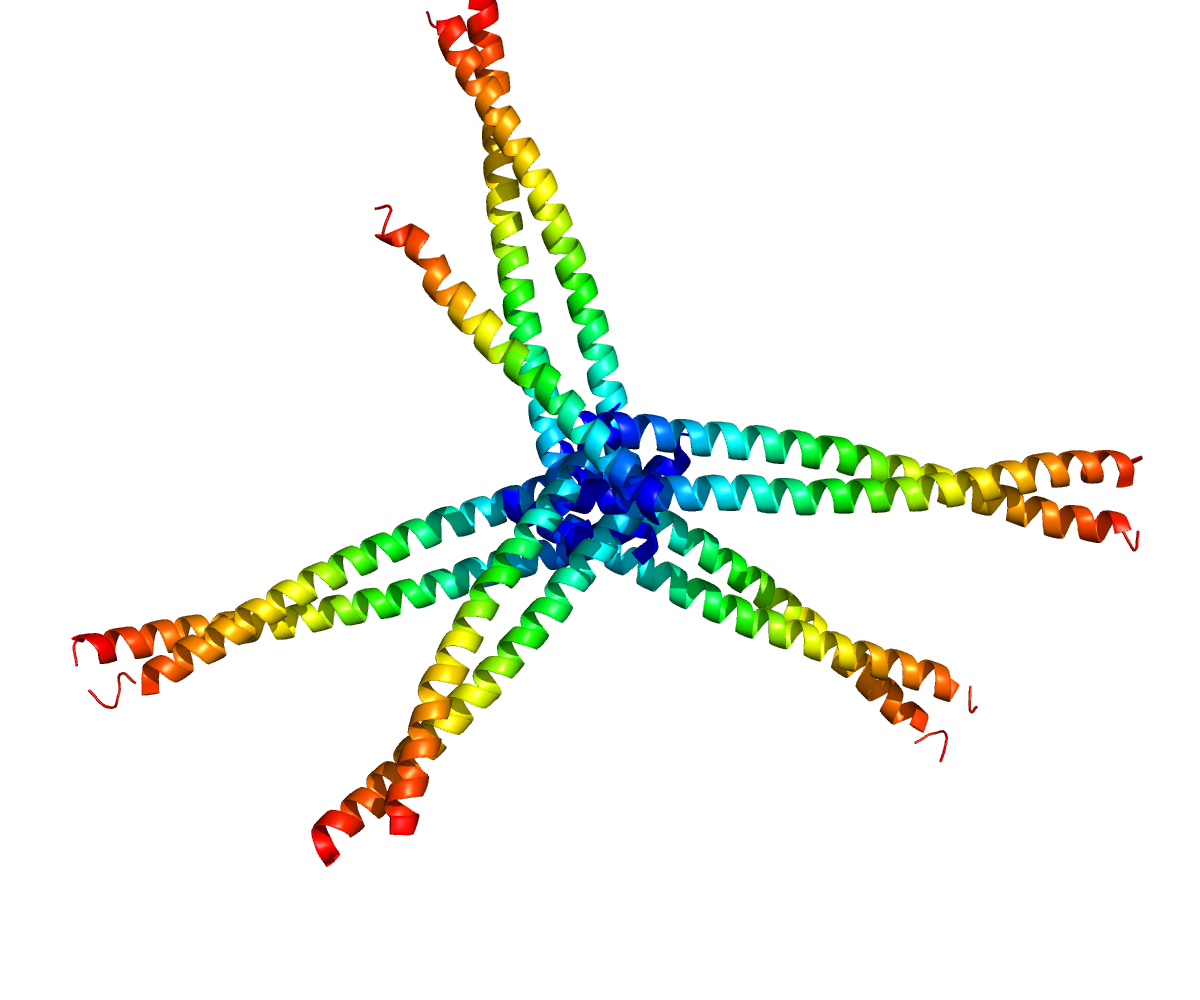

Identifiers
- Aliases: BST2, CD317, TETHERIN, Tetherin, bone marrow stromal cell antigen 2, HM1.24
- External IDs: OMIM: 600534; MGI: 1916800; GeneCards: BST2
Available structures
| PDB | Ortholog search: PDBe RCSB |
| PDB | List of PDB id codes 2LK9, 2X7A, 2XG7, 3MQ7, 3MQ9, 3MQB, 3MQC, 3NWH, 4P6Z |

Gene location (Human)
| Chr. | Chromosome 19 (human) |
| Band | 19p13.11 | Start | 17,402,939 bp |
| Band | 19p13.11 | End | 17,405,630 bp |

Gene location (Mouse)
| Chr. | Chromosome 8 (mouse) |
| Band | 8|8 B3.3 | Start | 71,986,899 bp |
| Band | 8|8 B3.3 | End | 71,990,100 bp |
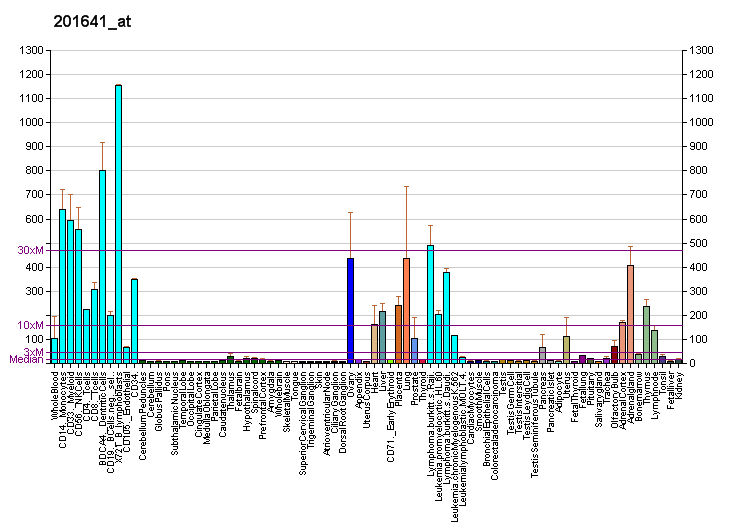
RNA expression pattern
| Bgee | Human / Mouse (ortholog); Top expressed in: right adrenal gland; right adrenal cortex; left adrenal cortex; left ovary; right ovary; left uterine tube; monocyte; granulocyte; spleen; right uterine tube / Top expressed in: left lobe of liver; yolk sac; stroma of bone marrow; endothelial cell of lymphatic vessel; mucous cell of stomach; thymus; interventricular septum; uterus; subcutaneous adipose tissue; mesenteric lymph nodes; More reference expression data |
| BioGPS | More reference expression data |
Gene ontology
| Molecular function | protein homodimerization activity; signal transducer activity; protein binding; metalloendopeptidase inhibitor activity; RNA binding; identical protein binding |
| Cellular component | cytoplasm; integral component of membrane; multivesicular body; endosome; late endosome; Golgi apparatus; membrane; plasma membrane; integral component of plasma membrane; cell surface; apical plasma membrane; membrane raft; anchored component of membrane; extracellular exosome; cytosol; azurophil granule membrane |
| Biological process | negative regulation of intracellular transport of viral material; regulation of actin cytoskeleton organization; response to interferon-gamma; immune system process; cell-cell signaling; response to virus; response to interferon-beta; multicellular organism development; B cell activation; negative regulation of viral genome replication; negative regulation of cell migration; humoral immune response; defense response to virus; type I interferon signaling pathway; negative regulation of cell growth; negative regulation of plasmacytoid dendritic cell cytokine production; response to interferon-alpha; positive regulation of I-kappaB kinase/NF-kappaB signaling; cell population proliferation; innate immune response; negative regulation of endopeptidase activity; neutrophil degranulation |
Sources:Amigo / QuickGO
Orthologs
| Databases | NCBI: entry; OMA: entry |
| Species | Human | Mouse |
| Entrez | 684 | 69550 |
| Ensembl | ENSG00000130303 | ENSMUSG00000046718 |
| UniProt | Q10589 | Q8R2Q8 |
| RefSeq (mRNA) | NM_004335 | NM_198095 |
| RefSeq (protein) | NP_004326 | NP_932763 |
| Location (UCSC) | Chr 19: 17.4 – 17.41 Mb | Chr 8: 71.99 – 71.99 Mb |
| PubMed search |
- Wikidata
| View/Edit Human | View/Edit Mouse |

Tetherin, also known as bone marrow stromal antigen 2, is a lipid raft associated protein that in humans is encoded by the BST2 gene. In addition, tetherin has been designated as CD317 (cluster of differentiation 317). This protein is constitutively expressed in mature B cells, plasma cells and plasmacytoid dendritic cells, and in many other cells, it is only expressed as a response to stimuli from IFN pathway.

== Gene activation ==
Tetherin is part of IFN-dependent antiviral response pathway. When the presence of virus and viral components is detected by recognition molecules such as (RIG-I), a cascades of interactions happen between signaling molecules, eventually the signal reaches the nucleus to upregulate the expression of interferon-stimulated genes (ISGs), this in turn activates IFN-α pathway to send the signal to neighboring cells, which causes upregulation in the expression of other ISGs and many viral restriction factors, such as tetherin.

Tetherin/BST2 and BST1 genes are unregulated by the Nicotinamide (NAM) metabolism pathway.

== Function ==
Tetherin is a human cellular protein which inhibits retrovirus infection by preventing the diffusion of virus particles after budding from infected cells. Initially discovered as an inhibitor to HIV-1 infection in the absence of Vpu, tetherin has also been shown to inhibit the release of other RNA viruses such as the Lassa and Marburg virions suggesting a common mechanism that inhibits enveloped virus release without interaction with viral proteins. In addition, tetherin also restricts neuroinvasion of the DNA virus HSV-1. However, in contrast to its anti-viral role, it has recently been shown that basal levels of BST2 or Tetherin are required for HIV-1 replication but this isn't an indication that higher than basal levels of BST2 promotes viral replication. More definite research is required.

Beyond viral particles, BST2 (CD317) may also tether native cellular membrane components to the cell surface, including extracellular vesicles or exosomes, thereby limiting their release and diffusion to other cells. By restricting the spread of such vesicles, BST2 could influence intercellular communication and signaling in physiological and pathological contexts.

== Structure ==
Tetherin is a type 2 integral membrane protein, with the N-terminus in the cytoplasm, one membrane spanning domain, and a C-terminus modified by the addition of a glycosyl-phosphatidylinositol (gpi) anchor. The transmembrane of tetherin is predicted to be a single alpha helix. The ectodomain consists of alpha helical coiled-coil region where the coils are slightly spread apart. Although Tetherin is localized to the lipid rafts on the surface of the cells, they are endocytosed to be sorted through TGN by clathrin-dependent pathway. This is mediated by AP2 binding to the dual-tyrosine motif located in the cytosolic domain of tetherin. When the virion buds from the surface of the cell, one of the tetherin membrane domains is in the new viral membrane, the other remains in the plasma membrane, tethering the virion to the cell. It is antagonized by the viral protein Vpu which is thought to work by targeting tetherin for degradation via the β-TrCP2 dependent pathway.

Tetherin exists as a dimer on the surface of cells, and prevention of dimerisation by mutating the cystine residues, prevents tetherin from inhibiting virus release, although it is still detectable in the cell. The stabilization of the protein through disulfide bond within the coiled coil region seems to be important in its function

== Interaction with different viruses ==
Tetherin is known to block many different types of enveloped viruses by tethering the budding virus like particles (VLPs) and inhibiting them from leaving the cell surface. Studies have shown that it is not the amino acid sequence, but the topology of tetherin is required for the tethering of virions on the cell surface. Their unique topology allows them to be in the cell through their N-terminus while using the GPI anchor to attach to budding virions. HIV-1 overcomes this restriction through vpu. Vpu interacts with tetherin by interacting with the protein at its transmembrane domain and recruiting β-TrCP2, which causes ubiquitination and degradation of tetherin. It has been recently shown that tetherin gene variants are associated with HIV disease progression underscoring the role of BST-2 in HIV type 1 infection. Another primate lentivirus, SIV, also, counteracts tetherin by their removal from the plasma membrane. KSHV protein K5 also targets tetherin for degradation through ubiquitination. Ebola counteracts tethrin through two mechanism. VP35 of Ebola, inhibits multiple steps of IFN-signaling pathway, which blocks the induction of tetherin as a downstream effect. Also, it has been noted that the full-length Ebola GP may either translocate tetherin or disrupt the structure of tetherin. Sendai virus proteins HN and F direct tethrin to endosomes or proteasome for degradation. CHIKV protein nsP1 interacts with tetherin by disrupting the tetherin-virion complex formation.

Cell-to-cell transmission through virological synapse in human retroviruses is also inhibited by tetherin. Tetherin aggregates virions and downmodulates the infectivity of the virions. It has also been suggested that tetherin may be involved in the structural integrity of the virological synapse.

BST2/tetherin is a potent inhibitor of SARS-CoV-2.

== Tetherin as a biomarker and other functions ==
Tetherin has been shown as a Type-I-IFN biomarker using flow cytometry, B cell Tetherin was used as a Cell-Specific Assay for Response to Type I Interferon Predicts Clinical Features and Flares in Systemic Lupus Erythematosus. Tetherin has also been predicted to be involved in cell adhesion and cell migration. Recently it has, also, been identified as the protein that help stabilize lipid rafts by joining nearby lipid rafts to form a cluster. For some viruses, such as Dengue virus, tetherin inhibits the budding of virions as well as cell-to-cell transmission of the virus. For human cytomegalovirus (HCMV), tetherin promotes entry of the virus, especially during cell differentiation. It has also been shown that tetherin is incorporated into newly formed virions.

Tetherin expression has also been reported to be rapidly induced on the surface of hematopoietic stem cells following challenge with viral-like (poly-Inosinic-poly-Cytidylic acid) or bacterial-like (Lipopolysaccharide) immune stimuli. It was found that tetherin expression marked entry of quiescent hematopoietic stem cells into cell cycle following these stimulation.
