= FBXL3 =

Protein-coding gene in the species Homo sapiens

Identifiers
- Aliases: FBXL3, FBL3, FBL3A, FBXL3A, F-box and leucine-rich repeat protein 3, F-box and leucine rich repeat protein 3, IDDSFAS
- External IDs: OMIM: 605653; MGI: 1354702; GeneCards: FBXL3
Available structures
PDB	Ortholog search: PDBe RCSB
PDB	List of PDB id codes 4I6J

Gene location (Human)
Chr.	Chromosome 13 (human)
Band	13q22.3	Start	76,992,598 bp
Band	13q22.3	End	77,027,195 bp

Gene location (Mouse)
Chr.	Chromosome 14 (mouse)
Band	14|14 E2.3	Start	103,317,675 bp
Band	14|14 E2.3	End	103,337,002 bp
RNA expression pattern
Bgee	Human / Mouse (ortholog); Top expressed in: cardiac muscle tissue of right atrium; Achilles tendon; skin of arm; superficial temporal artery; skin of hip; trabecular bone; germinal epithelium; endothelial cell; skin of thigh; synovial joint / Top expressed in: aortic valve; ascending aorta; neural layer of retina; granulocyte; lobe of cerebellum; muscle of thigh; cerebellar vermis; genital tubercle; tail of embryo; left colon; More reference expression data
BioGPS	n/a
Gene ontology
Molecular function	protein binding; ubiquitin-protein transferase activity; ubiquitin protein ligase activity
Cellular component	cytoplasm; ubiquitin ligase complex; SCF ubiquitin ligase complex; nucleus; cytosol; nuclear body
Biological process	SCF-dependent proteasomal ubiquitin-dependent protein catabolic process; entrainment of circadian clock by photoperiod; regulation of circadian rhythm; protein destabilization; protein ubiquitination; rhythmic process; proteasome-mediated ubiquitin-dependent protein catabolic process; protein polyubiquitination; post-translational protein modification
Sources:Amigo / QuickGO
Orthologs
Databases	NCBI: entry; OMA: entry
Species	Human	Mouse
Entrez	26224	50789
Ensembl	ENSG00000005812	ENSMUSG00000022124
UniProt	Q9UKT7	Q8C4V4
RefSeq (mRNA)	NM_012158	NM_015822; NM_001347600; NM_001347601; NM_001360341; NM_001360342
RefSeq (protein)	NP_036290	NP_001334529; NP_001334530; NP_056637; NP_001347270; NP_001347271
Location (UCSC)	Chr 13: 76.99 – 77.03 Mb	Chr 14: 103.32 – 103.34 Mb
PubMed search
- Wikidata
View/Edit Human	View/Edit Mouse

FBXL3 is a gene in humans and mice that encodes the F-box/LRR-repeat protein 3 (FBXL3). FBXL3 is a member of the F-box protein family, which constitutes one of the four subunits in the SCF ubiquitin ligase complex.

The FBXL3 protein participates in the negative feedback loop responsible for generating molecular circadian rhythms in mammals by binding to the CRY1 and CRY2 proteins to facilitate their polyubiquitination by the SCF complex and their subsequent degradation by the proteasome.

== Discovery ==
The Fbxl3 gene function was independently identified in 2007 by three groups, led by Michele Pagano, Joseph S. Takahashi, Dr. Patrick Nolan and Michael Hastings, respectively. Takahashi used forward genetics N-ethyl-N-nitrosourea (ENU) mutagenesis to screen for mice with varied circadian activity which led to the discovery of the Overtime (Ovtm) mutant of the Fbxl3 gene. Nolan discovered the Fbxl3 mutation After hours (Afh) by a forward screen assessing wheel activity behavior of mutagenized mice. The phenotypes identified in mice were mechanistically explained by Pagano who discovered that the FBXL3 protein is necessary for the reactivation of the CLOCK and BMAL1 protein heterodimer by inducing the degradation of CRY proteins.

=== Overtime ===
Mice with the homozygous mutation of Ovtm, free run with an intrinsic period of 26 hours. Overtime is a loss of function mutation caused by a substitution of isoleucine to threonine in the region of FBXL3 that binds to CRY. In mice with this mutation, levels of the proteins PER1 and PER2 are decreased, while levels of CRY proteins do not differ from those of wild type mice. The stabilization of CRY protein levels leads to continued repression of Per1 and Per2 transcription and translation.

=== After-hours ===
The After-hours mutation is a substitution of cysteine to serine at position 358. Similar to Overtime, the mutation occurs in the region where FBXL3 binds to CRY. Mice homozygous for the Afh mutation have a free running period of about 27 hours. The Afh mutation delays the rate of CRY protein degradation, therefore affecting the transcription of PER2 protein.

=== Fbxl21 ===
The closest homologue to Fbxl3 is Fbxl21 as it also binds to the CRY1 and CRY2 proteins. Predominantly localized to the cytosol, Fbxl21 has been proposed to antagonize the action of Fbxl3 through ubiquitination and stabilization of CRY proteins instead of leading it to degradation. FBXL21 is expressed predominantly in the suprachiasmatic nucleus, which is the region in the brain that functions as the master pacemaker in mammals.

== Characteristics ==
The human FBXL3 gene is located on the long arm of chromosome 13 at position 22.3. The protein is composed of 428 amino acids and has a mass of 48,707 daltons. The FBXL3 protein contains an F-box domain, characterized by a 40 amino acid motif that mediates protein-protein interactions, and several tandem leucine-rich repeats used for substrate recognition. It has eight post-translational modification sites involving ubiquitination and four sites involving phosphorylation. The FBXL3 protein is predominantly localized to the nucleus. It is one of four subunits of a ubiquitin ligase complex called SKP1-CUL1-F-box-protein, which includes the proteins CUL1, SKP1, and RBX1.

== Function ==
The FBXL3 protein plays a role in the negative feedback loop of the mammalian molecular circadian rhythm. The PER and CRY proteins inhibit the transcription factors CLOCK and BMAL1. The degradation of PER and CRY prevent the inhibition of the CLOCK and BMAL1 protein heterodimer. In the nucleus, the FBXL3 protein targets CRY1 and CRY2 for polyubiquitination, which triggers the degradation of the proteins by the proteasome. The crystal structure of a FBXL3-CRY2 complex reveals that FBXL3 binds to CRY2 by occupying its flavin adenine dinucleotide (FAD) cofactor pocket with the C-terminal tail of the F-box protein and buries the PER-binding interface on the CRY2 protein.

The FBXL3 protein is also involved in a related feedback loop that regulates the transcription of the Bmal1 gene. Bmal1 expression is regulated by the binding of REV-ERBα and RORα proteins to retinoic acid-related orphan receptor response elements (ROREs) in the Bmal1 promoter region. The binding of the REV-ERBα protein to the promoter represses expression, while RORα binding activates expression. FBXL3 decreases the repression of Bmal1 transcription by inactivating the REV-ERBα and HDAC3 repressor complex.

The FBXL3 protein has also been found to cooperatively degrade c-MYC when bound to CRY2. The c-MYC protein is a transcription factor important in regulating cell proliferation. The CRY2 protein can function as a co-factor for the FBXL3 ligase complex and interacts with phosphorylated c-MYC. This interaction promotes the ubiquitination and degradation of the c-MYC protein.

== Interactions ==
FBXL3 has been shown to interact with:

- SKP1A
- CRY1
- CRY2
- REV-ERBα
- HDAC3
- c-MYC
