= FZR1 =

Protein-coding gene in humans

Identifiers
- Aliases: FZR1, CDC20C, CDH1, FZR, FZR2, HCDH, HCDH1, fizzy/cell division cycle 20 related 1, fizzy and cell division cycle 20 related 1
- External IDs: OMIM: 603619; MGI: 1926790; GeneCards: FZR1
Available structures
PDB	Ortholog search: PDBe RCSB
PDB	List of PDB id codes 4UI9

Gene location (Human)
Chr.	Chromosome 19 (human)
Band	19p13.3	Start	3,506,311 bp
Band	19p13.3	End	3,538,334 bp

Gene location (Mouse)
Chr.	Chromosome 10 (mouse)
Band	10|10 C1	Start	81,202,056 bp
Band	10|10 C1	End	81,214,350 bp
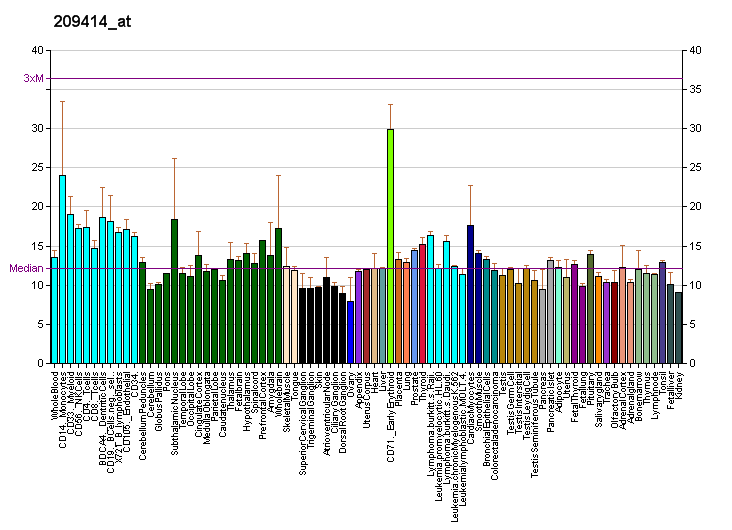

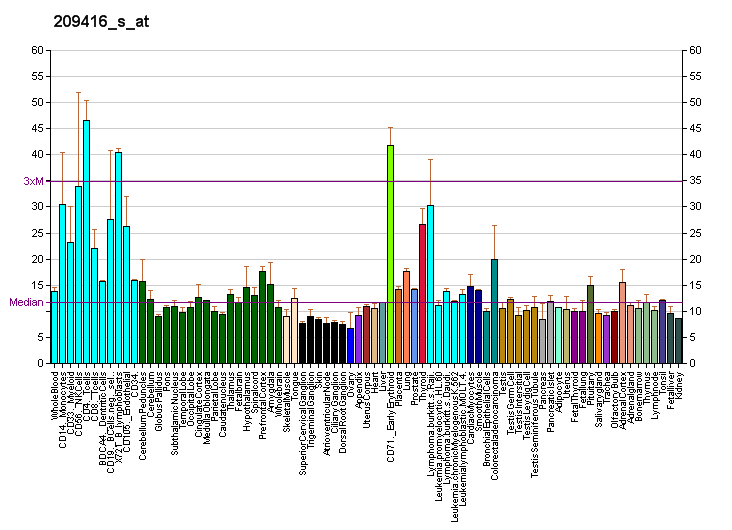

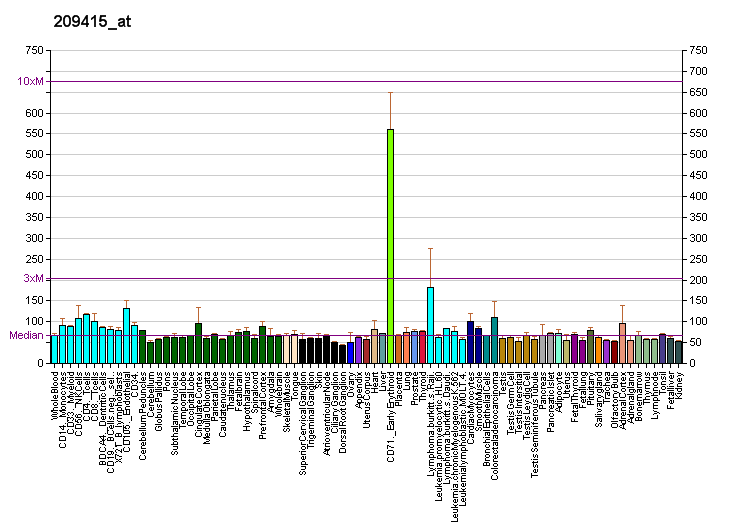
RNA expression pattern
Bgee	Human / Mouse (ortholog); Top expressed in: ventricular zone; left testis; right testis; sural nerve; anterior pituitary; ganglionic eminence; skin of leg; right hemisphere of cerebellum; tendon of biceps brachii; stromal cell of endometrium / Top expressed in: spermatid; seminiferous tubule; ventricular zone; spermatocyte; interventricular septum; yolk sac; fetal liver hematopoietic progenitor cell; dentate gyrus of hippocampal formation granule cell; neural tube; primary visual cortex; More reference expression data
BioGPS	More reference expression data
Gene ontology
Molecular function	protein binding; anaphase-promoting complex binding; ubiquitin-protein transferase activator activity
Cellular component	cytoplasm; cytosol; nuclear membrane; nucleoplasm; anaphase-promoting complex; nucleus
Biological process	positive regulation of protein catabolic process; regulation of meiotic nuclear division; cellular response to DNA damage stimulus; cell division; protein K11-linked ubiquitination; lens fiber cell differentiation; protein ubiquitination; positive regulation of cell population proliferation; cell cycle; anaphase-promoting complex-dependent catabolic process; DNA repair; positive regulation of ubiquitin protein ligase activity; mitotic G2 DNA damage checkpoint signaling; regulation of mitotic cell cycle phase transition; ubiquitin-dependent protein catabolic process
Sources:Amigo / QuickGO
Orthologs
Databases	NCBI: entry; OMA: entry
Species	Human	Mouse
Entrez	51343	56371
Ensembl	ENSG00000105325	ENSMUSG00000020235
UniProt	Q9UM11	Q9R1K5
RefSeq (mRNA)	NM_001136197; NM_001136198; NM_016263	NM_019757
RefSeq (protein)	NP_001129669; NP_001129670; NP_057347	NP_062731
Location (UCSC)	Chr 19: 3.51 – 3.54 Mb	Chr 10: 81.2 – 81.21 Mb
PubMed search
- Wikidata
View/Edit Human	View/Edit Mouse

Fizzy-related protein homolog, also known as hCDH1, is a protein that in humans is encoded by the FZR1 gene.

== Interactions ==
FZR1 has been shown to interact with CDC27 and FBXO5.
