= FBXW2 =

Protein-coding gene in the species Homo sapiens

Identifiers
- Aliases: FBXW2, FBW2, Fwd2, Md6, F-box and WD repeat domain containing 2
- External IDs: OMIM: 609071; MGI: 1353435; GeneCards: FBXW2

Gene location (Human)
Chr.	Chromosome 9 (human)
Band	9q33.2	Start	120,751,978 bp
Band	9q33.2	End	120,793,416 bp

Gene location (Mouse)
Chr.	Chromosome 2 (mouse)
Band	2|2 B	Start	34,694,526 bp
Band	2|2 B	End	34,716,323 bp
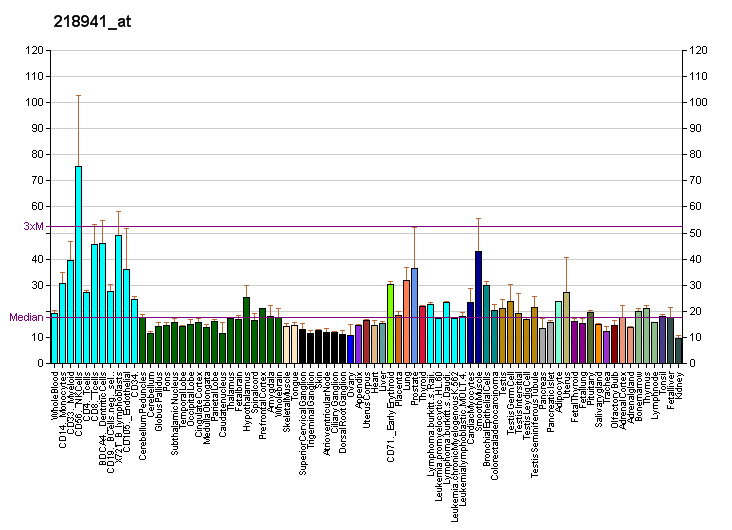
RNA expression pattern
Bgee	Human / Mouse (ortholog); Top expressed in: buccal mucosa cell; mucosa of sigmoid colon; vulva; trabecular bone; skin of hip; skin of thigh; lower lobe of lung; caput epididymis; human penis; germinal epithelium / Top expressed in: dentate gyrus of hippocampal formation granule cell; muscle of thigh; superior frontal gyrus; lumbar spinal ganglion; endocardial cushion; lip; thymus; ventricular zone; blood; neural layer of retina; More reference expression data
BioGPS	More reference expression data
Gene ontology
Molecular function	protein binding; ubiquitin-protein transferase activity
Cellular component	cytosol
Biological process	proteolysis; protein polyubiquitination; post-translational protein modification
Sources:Amigo / QuickGO
Orthologs
Databases	NCBI: entry; OMA: entry
Species	Human	Mouse
Entrez	26190	30050
Ensembl	ENSG00000119402	ENSMUSG00000035949
UniProt	Q9UKT8; Q4VXH1	Q60584
RefSeq (mRNA)	NM_012164; NM_001375888; NM_001375889; NM_001375890	NM_001164768; NM_001164769; NM_001164770; NM_001164772; NM_013890 NM_001379115; NM_001379116; NM_001379117; NM_001379118
RefSeq (protein)	NP_036296; NP_001362817; NP_001362818; NP_001362819	n/a
Location (UCSC)	Chr 9: 120.75 – 120.79 Mb	Chr 2: 34.69 – 34.72 Mb
PubMed search
- Wikidata
View/Edit Human	View/Edit Mouse

F-box/WD repeat-containing protein 2 is a protein that in humans is encoded by the FBXW2 gene.

== Function ==
F-box proteins are an expanding family of eukaryotic proteins characterized by an approximately 40 amino acid motif, the F box. Some F-box proteins have been shown to be critical for the ubiquitin-mediated degradation of cellular regulatory proteins. In fact, F-box proteins are one of the four subunits of ubiquitin protein ligases, called SCFs. SCF ligases bring ubiquitin conjugating enzymes to substrates that are specifically recruited by the different F-box proteins. Mammalian F-box proteins are classified into three groups based on the presence of either WD-40 repeats, leucine-rich repeats, or the presence or absence of other protein-protein interacting domains. This gene encodes the second identified member of the F-box gene family and contains multiple WD-40 repeats.

== Interactions ==
FBXW2 has been shown to interact with SKP1A.
