= CDC34 =

Protein-coding gene in humans

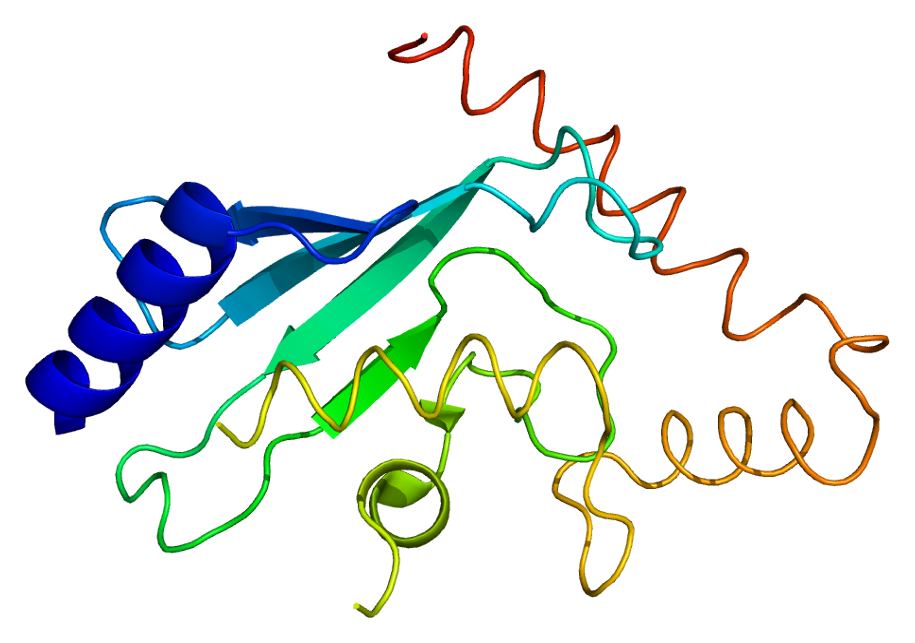

Identifiers
- Aliases: CDC34, E2-UBC3, UBCH3, UBE2R1, cell division cycle 34, cell division cycle 34, ubiqiutin conjugating enzyme
- External IDs: OMIM: 116948; MGI: 102657; GeneCards: CDC34
Available structures
PDB	Ortholog search: PDBe RCSB
PDB	List of PDB id codes 2OB4, 3RZ3, 4MDK
Enzyme activity
EC #	BRENDA	ExPASy	KEGG	MetaCyc
2.3.2.23	↗	↗	↗	↗
2.3.2.24	↗	↗	↗	↗

Gene location (Human)
Chr.	Chromosome 19 (human)
Band	19p13.3	Start	531,760 bp
Band	19p13.3	End	542,092 bp

Gene location (Mouse)
Chr.	Chromosome 10 (mouse)
Band	10 C1|10 39.72 cM	Start	79,518,029 bp
Band	10 C1|10 39.72 cM	End	79,524,232 bp
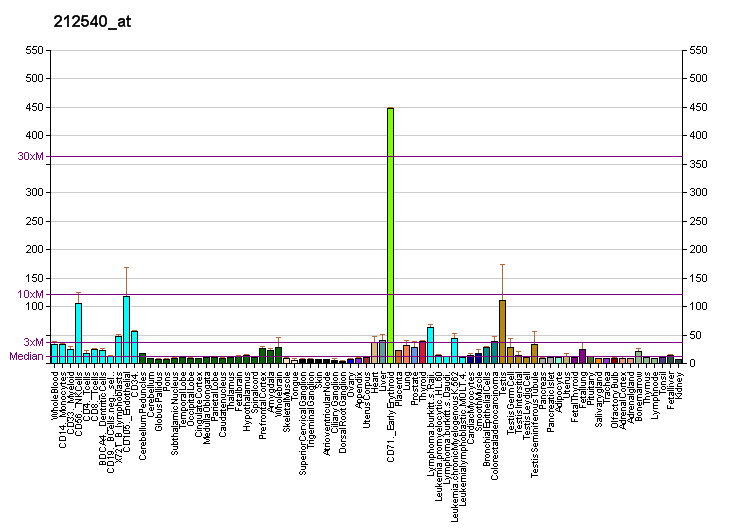
RNA expression pattern
Bgee	Human / Mouse (ortholog); Top expressed in: left testis; right testis; apex of heart; ventricular zone; right hemisphere of cerebellum; muscle layer of sigmoid colon; muscle of thigh; ganglionic eminence; right lobe of liver; gastrocnemius muscle / Top expressed in: quadriceps femoris muscle; muscle of thigh; muscle tissue; skeletal muscle tissue; epiblast; testicle; placenta; lip; white adipose tissue; yolk sac; More reference expression data
BioGPS	More reference expression data
Gene ontology
Molecular function	transferase activity; nucleotide binding; ubiquitin protein ligase activity; ubiquitin-protein transferase activity; protein binding; ATP binding; ubiquitin conjugating enzyme activity; ubiquitin protein ligase binding
Cellular component	nucleus; nucleoplasm; cytoplasm; cytosol; nuclear speck
Biological process	negative regulation of cAMP-mediated signaling; cellular response to interferon-beta; protein polyubiquitination; positive regulation of inclusion body assembly; protein K48-linked ubiquitination; positive regulation of neuron apoptotic process; DNA replication initiation; cell cycle; response to growth factor; proteasome-mediated ubiquitin-dependent protein catabolic process; protein ubiquitination; G1/S transition of mitotic cell cycle; ubiquitin-dependent protein catabolic process
Sources:Amigo / QuickGO
Orthologs
Databases	NCBI: entry; OMA: entry
Species	Human	Mouse
Entrez	997	216150
Ensembl	ENSG00000099804	ENSMUSG00000020307
UniProt	P49427	Q8CFI2
RefSeq (mRNA)	NM_004359	NM_177613; NM_001359817; NM_001359818
RefSeq (protein)	NP_004350	NP_808281; NP_001346746; NP_001346747
Location (UCSC)	Chr 19: 0.53 – 0.54 Mb	Chr 10: 79.52 – 79.52 Mb
PubMed search
- Wikidata
View/Edit Human	View/Edit Mouse

CDC34 is a gene that in humans encodes the protein Ubiquitin-conjugating enzyme E2 R1. This protein is a member of the ubiquitin-conjugating enzyme family, which catalyzes the covalent attachment of ubiquitin to other proteins.

CDC34 was originally discovered by work in baker's yeast as a gene that is essential for the cell cycle. Cdc34 in yeast targets numerous substrates - notably the cyclin-dependent kinase inhibitor Sic1 - for ubiquitin-mediated protein degradation. CDC34 is required for ubiquitin-mediated degradation of cell cycle G1 regulators, and for the initiation of DNA replication.

== Interactions ==
CDC34 has been shown to interact with CSNK2B, BTRC and CDK9.
