= CLSPN =

Protein-coding gene in humans

Identifiers
- Aliases: CLSPN, claspin
- External IDs: OMIM: 605434; MGI: 2445153; HomoloGene: 11138; GeneCards: CLSPN; OMA:CLSPN - orthologs

Gene location (Human)
Chr.	Chromosome 1 (human)
Band	1p34.3	Start	35,720,218 bp
Band	1p34.3	End	35,769,978 bp

Gene location (Mouse)
Chr.	Chromosome 4 (mouse)
Band	4|4 D2.2	Start	126,450,728 bp
Band	4|4 D2.2	End	126,487,696 bp
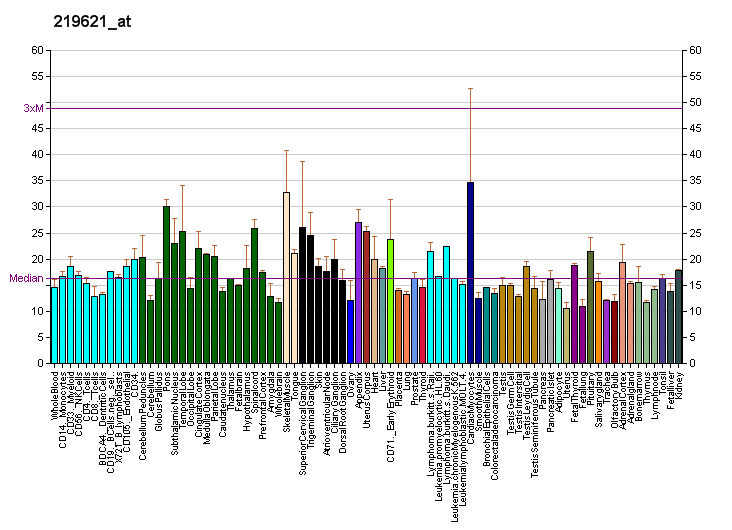
RNA expression pattern
Bgee	Human / Mouse (ortholog); Top expressed in: testicle; gonad; ganglionic eminence; ventricular zone; bone marrow cell; stromal cell of endometrium; pancreatic ductal cell; appendix; buccal mucosa cell; right testis / Top expressed in: tail of embryo; hand; zygote; secondary oocyte; genital tubercle; primary oocyte; otic vesicle; ventricular zone; maxillary prominence; epiblast; More reference expression data
BioGPS	More reference expression data
Gene ontology
Molecular function	DNA binding; protein binding; anaphase-promoting complex binding
Cellular component	nucleus; nucleoplasm; Golgi apparatus
Biological process	DNA replication; cell cycle; DNA damage checkpoint signaling; mitotic DNA replication checkpoint signaling; peptidyl-serine phosphorylation; activation of protein kinase activity; cellular response to DNA damage stimulus; DNA repair; protein deubiquitination; mitotic G2 DNA damage checkpoint signaling
Sources:Amigo / QuickGO
Orthologs
Species	Human	Mouse
Entrez	63967	269582
Ensembl	ENSG00000092853	ENSMUSG00000042489
UniProt	Q9HAW4	Q80YR7
RefSeq (mRNA)	NM_001190481; NM_022111; NM_001330490	NM_175554
RefSeq (protein)	NP_001177410; NP_001317419; NP_071394	NP_780763; NP_001392727; NP_001392728; NP_001392729; NP_001392730
Location (UCSC)	Chr 1: 35.72 – 35.77 Mb	Chr 4: 126.45 – 126.49 Mb
PubMed search
- Wikidata
View/Edit Human	View/Edit Mouse

Claspin is a protein that in humans is encoded by the CLSPN gene.

== Function ==
Xenopus claspin is an essential upstream regulator of checkpoint kinase 1 and triggers a checkpoint arrest of the cell cycle in the presence of DNA templates in Xenopus egg extracts. The human gene appears to be the homolog Xenopus claspin and its function has not been determined.

== Interactions ==
CLSPN has been shown to interact with:

- BRCA1,
- CDC45,
- CHEK1,
- POLE,
- RAD17, and
- USP7.
