= FBXO5 =

Protein-coding gene in the species Homo sapiens

Identifiers
- Aliases: FBXO5, EMI1, FBX5, Fbxo31, F-box protein 5
- External IDs: OMIM: 606013; MGI: 1914391; GeneCards: FBXO5
Available structures
PDB	Ortholog search: PDBe RCSB
PDB	List of PDB id codes 2M6N, 4UI9

Gene location (Human)
Chr.	Chromosome 6 (human)
Band	6q25.2	Start	152,970,519 bp
Band	6q25.2	End	152,983,579 bp

Gene location (Mouse)
Chr.	Chromosome 10 (mouse)
Band	10|10 A1	Start	5,749,160 bp
Band	10|10 A1	End	5,755,600 bp
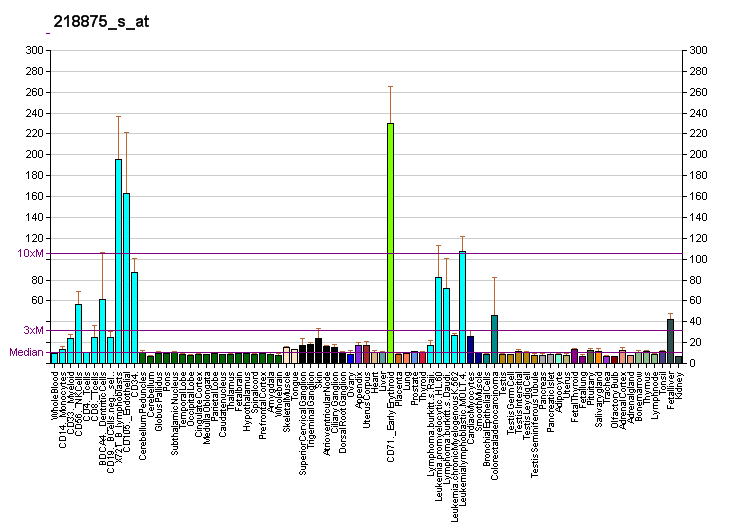
RNA expression pattern
Bgee	Human / Mouse (ortholog); Top expressed in: ventricular zone; ganglionic eminence; secondary oocyte; gonad; bone marrow; buccal mucosa cell; cartilage tissue; bone marrow cell; trabecular bone; testicle / Top expressed in: hand; superior cervical ganglion; maxillary prominence; mandibular prominence; primitive streak; genital tubercle; abdominal wall; epiblast; medial ganglionic eminence; zygote; More reference expression data
BioGPS	More reference expression data
Gene ontology
Molecular function	metal ion binding; protein binding; protein kinase binding; ubiquitin ligase inhibitor activity; anaphase-promoting complex binding
Cellular component	cytoplasm; cytosol; spindle; nucleoplasm; cytoskeleton; nucleus; meiotic spindle
Biological process	vesicle organization; regulation of meiotic nuclear division; microtubule polymerization; negative regulation of meiotic nuclear division; regulation of transcription involved in G1/S transition of mitotic cell cycle; cell division; spindle assembly; oocyte maturation; regulation of mitotic cell cycle; cell cycle; spindle assembly involved in female meiosis I; regulation of mitotic nuclear division; negative regulation of ubiquitin protein ligase activity; anaphase-promoting complex-dependent catabolic process; negative regulation of mitotic metaphase/anaphase transition; regulation of DNA replication; positive regulation of cell population proliferation; positive regulation of G2/M transition of mitotic cell cycle; negative regulation of DNA endoreduplication; positive regulation of osteoblast differentiation; negative regulation of ubiquitin-protein transferase activity; positive regulation of biomineral tissue development; positive regulation of mesenchymal stem cell migration; negative regulation of cellular senescence; negative regulation of response to DNA damage stimulus; protein ubiquitination; regulation of mitotic cell cycle phase transition
Sources:Amigo / QuickGO
Orthologs
Databases	NCBI: entry; OMA: entry
Species	Human	Mouse
Entrez	26271	67141
Ensembl	ENSG00000112029	ENSMUSG00000019773
UniProt	Q9UKT4	Q7TSG3
RefSeq (mRNA)	NM_001142522; NM_012177	NM_025995
RefSeq (protein)	NP_001135994; NP_036309	NP_080271
Location (UCSC)	Chr 6: 152.97 – 152.98 Mb	Chr 10: 5.75 – 5.76 Mb
PubMed search
- Wikidata
View/Edit Human	View/Edit Mouse

F-box only protein 5 is a protein that in humans is encoded by the FBXO5 gene.

== Function ==
This gene encodes a member of the F-box protein family which is characterized by an approximately 40 amino acid motif, the F-box. The F-box proteins constitute one of the four subunits of the ubiquitin protein ligase complex called SCFs (SKP1-cullin-F-box), which function in phosphorylation-dependent ubiquitination. The F-box proteins are divided into 3 classes: Fbws containing WD-40 domains, Fbls containing leucine-rich repeats, and Fbxs containing either different protein-protein interaction modules or no recognizable motifs. The protein encoded by this gene belongs to the Fbxs class. This protein is similar to xenopus early mitotic inhibitor-1 (Emi1), which is a mitotic regulator that interacts with Cdc20 and inhibits the anaphase promoting complex. Moreover, Emi1 also assembles a CRL1 complex that targets RAD51 for ubiquitin-mediated degradation.

== Disease ==
Gene and protein expression of FBXO5/Emi1 are increased in many human cancers and increased expression has been shown to cause chromosome instability and cancer.

== Interactions ==
FBXO5 has been shown to interact with:

- CDC20,
- FZR1,
- SKP1A. and
- RAD51.
