= S-phase kinase-associated protein 1 =

Protein-coding gene in the species Homo sapiens

SKP1
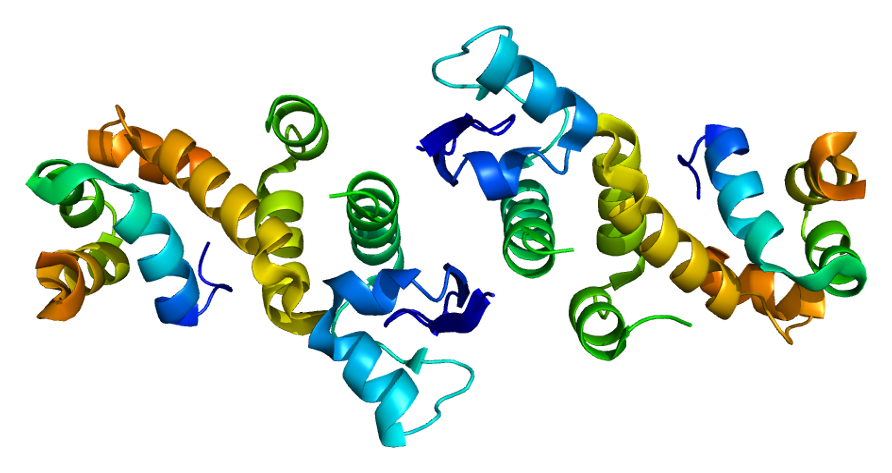

Identifiers
- Aliases: SKP1, EMC19, OCP-II, OCP2, SKP1A, TCEB1L, p19A, S-phase kinase-associated protein 1, S-phase kinase associated protein 1
- External IDs: OMIM: 601434; MGI: 103575; GeneCards: SKP1
Available structures
PDB	Ortholog search: PDBe RCSB
PDB	List of PDB id codes 1FQV, 1FS1, 1FS2, 1LDK, 1P22, 2ASS, 2AST, 2E31, 2E32, 2OVP, 2OVQ, 2OVR, 3L2O, 3WSO, 4I6J, 5IBK

Gene location (Human)
Chr.	Chromosome 5 (human)
Band	5q31.1	Start	134,148,935 bp
Band	5q31.1	End	134,176,964 bp

Gene location (Mouse)
Chr.	Chromosome 11 (mouse)
Band	11 B1.3|11 31.86 cM	Start	52,122,822 bp
Band	11 B1.3|11 31.86 cM	End	52,137,685 bp
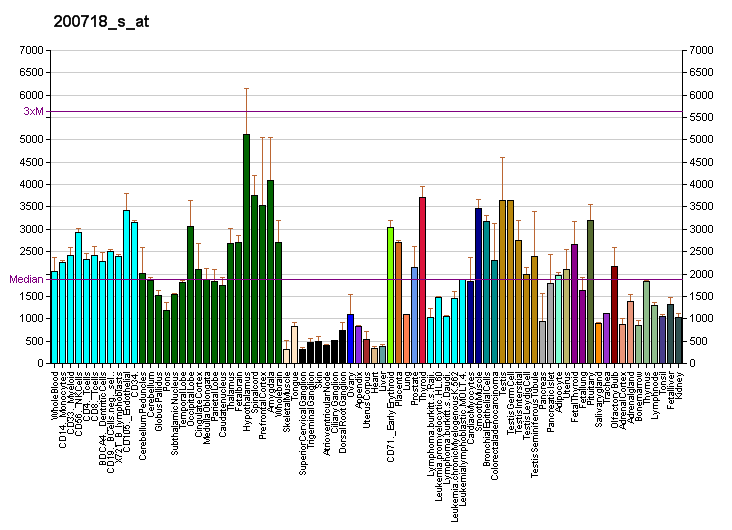

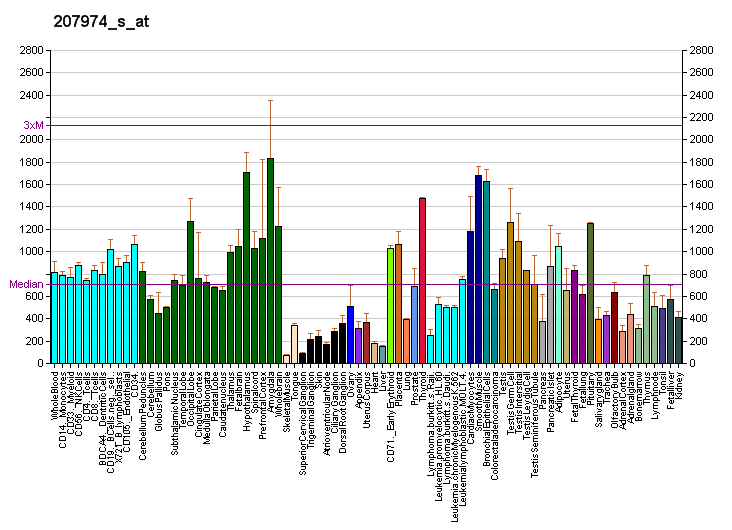

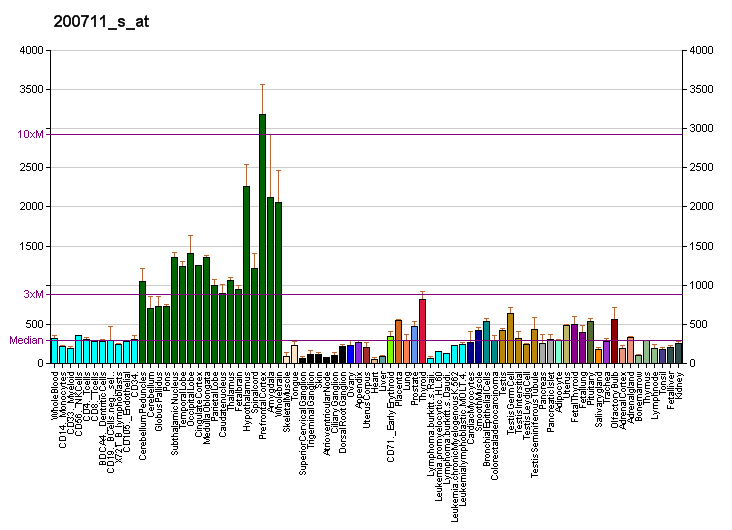
RNA expression pattern
Bgee	Human / Mouse (ortholog); Top expressed in: prefrontal cortex; right hemisphere of cerebellum; right frontal lobe; right testis; pons; left testis; Brodmann area 9; ganglionic eminence; right adrenal gland; C1 segment / Top expressed in: vestibular membrane of cochlear duct; primary oocyte; olfactory epithelium; spermatocyte; spermatid; medial ganglionic eminence; secondary oocyte; facial motor nucleus; anterior horn of spinal cord; embryonic cell; More reference expression data
BioGPS	More reference expression data
Gene ontology
Molecular function	cullin family protein binding; beta-catenin binding; ubiquitin protein ligase activity; protein binding; ubiquitin-protein transferase activity; protein domain specific binding
Cellular component	cytoplasm; nucleoplasm; PcG protein complex; nucleus; cytosol; SCF ubiquitin ligase complex; Cul7-RING ubiquitin ligase complex; centrosome
Biological process	ubiquitin-dependent protein catabolic process; histone H2A monoubiquitination; NIK/NF-kappaB signaling; G2/M transition of mitotic cell cycle; stress-activated MAPK cascade; protein ubiquitination; protein polyubiquitination; Wnt signaling pathway; SCF complex assembly; negative regulation of G2/M transition of mitotic cell cycle; maintenance of protein location in nucleus; cellular iron ion homeostasis; post-translational protein modification; interleukin-1-mediated signaling pathway; SCF-dependent proteasomal ubiquitin-dependent protein catabolic process; viral process; regulation of mitotic cell cycle phase transition; stimulatory C-type lectin receptor signaling pathway; Fc-epsilon receptor signaling pathway; T cell receptor signaling pathway
Sources:Amigo / QuickGO
Orthologs
Databases	NCBI: entry; OMA: entry
Species	Human	Mouse
Entrez	6500	21402
Ensembl	ENSG00000113558	ENSMUSG00000036309
UniProt	P63208	Q9WTX5
RefSeq (mRNA)	NM_170679; NM_006930	NM_011543
RefSeq (protein)	NP_008861; NP_733779	NP_035673
Location (UCSC)	Chr 5: 134.15 – 134.18 Mb	Chr 11: 52.12 – 52.14 Mb
PubMed search
- Wikidata
View/Edit Human	View/Edit Mouse

S-phase kinase-associated protein 1 is an enzyme that in humans is encoded by the SKP1 gene.

This gene encodes a protein that is a member of the SCF ubiquitin ligase protein complex. It binds to F-box proteins (proteins containing an F-box motif), such as cyclin F, S-phase kinase-associated protein 2, and other regulatory proteins involved in ubiquitin dependent proteolysis. The encoded protein also collaborates with a network of proteins to control beta-catenin levels and affects the activity level of beta-catenin dependent TCF transcription factors. Studies have also characterized the protein as an RNA polymerase II elongation factor. Alternative splicing of this gene results in two transcript variants. A related pseudogene has been identified on chromosome 7.

== Interactions ==
SKP1A has been shown to interact with:

- BTRC,
- CACYBP,
- CDCA3,
- CDK9,
- CUL1,
- FBXL3,
- FBXO4,
- FBXO5,
- FBXO7,
- FBXW2,
- FBXW7, and
- SKP2.
