= Vpu protein =

Vpu
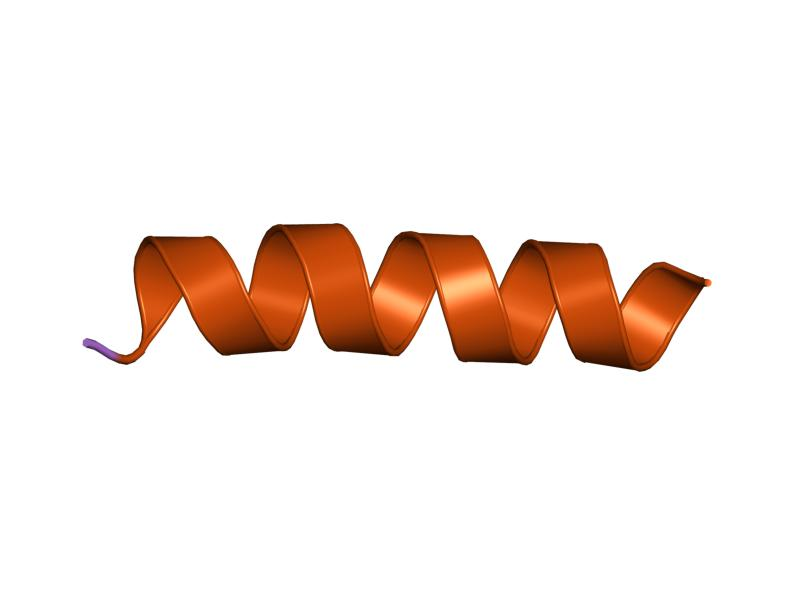
- structure of the channel-forming trans-membrane domain of virus protein "u" (vpu) from HIV-1

Identifiers
- Symbol: Vpu
- Pfam: PF00558
- InterPro: IPR008187
- SCOP2: 1vpu / SCOPe / SUPFAM
- TCDB: 1.A.40
- OPM superfamily: 262
- OPM protein: 2k7y
Available protein structures:
- PDB: IPR008187 PF00558 (ECOD; PDBsum)
- AlphaFold: IPR008187; PF00558

Viral Protein Unique

Identifiers
- Organism: HIV-1
- Symbol: vpu
- Entrez: 155945
- Orthologs: NCBI: entry; OMA: entry
- RefSeq (Prot): NP_057855.1
- UniProt: P05919

Other data
- Chromosome: viral genome: 0.01 - 0.01 Mb
Search for
- Structures: Swiss-model
- Domains: InterPro

Vpu is an accessory protein that in HIV is encoded by the vpu gene. Vpu stands for "Viral Protein U". The Vpu protein acts in the degradation of CD4 in the endoplasmic reticulum and in the enhancement of virion release from the plasma membrane of infected cells. Vpu induces the degradation of the CD4 viral receptor and therefore participates in the general downregulation of CD4 expression during the course of HIV infection. Vpu-mediated CD4 degradation is thought to prevent CD4-Env binding in the endoplasmic reticulum to facilitate proper Env assembly into virions. It is found in the membranes of infected cells, but not the virus particles themselves.

The Vpu gene is found exclusively in HIV-1 and some HIV-1-related simian immunodeficiency virus (SIV) isolates, such as SIV_{cpz}, SIV_{gsn}, and SIV_{mon}, but not in HIV-2 or the majority of SIV isolates. Structural similarities between Vpu and another small viral protein, M2, encoded by influenza A virus were first noted soon after the discovery of Vpu. Since then, Vpu has been shown to form cation-selective ion channels when expressed in Xenopus oocytes or mammalian cells and also when purified and reconstituted into planar lipid bilayers. Vpu also permeabilizes membranes of bacteria and mammalian cells to small molecules. Therefore, it is considered a member of the Viroporins family.

== Expression ==
Vpu and Env are expressed from the same bicistronic mRNA in a Rev-dependent manner, presumably by leaky scanning of ribosomes through the vpu initiation codon. In fact Vpu gene overlaps at its 3′-end with the env gene. Several HIV-1 isolates were found to carry point mutations in the Vpu translation initiation codon but have otherwise intact vpu genes. Since removal of the Vpu initiation codon results in increased expression of the downstream env gene, it is possible that HIV-1 actually uses this mechanism as a molecular switch to regulate the relative expression of Vpu or Env in infected cells. The possible benefits of such a regulation are unclear.

== Function ==
Two main functions have been assigned to the Vpu protein. The first function is known to induce degradation of the viral receptor molecule CD4, and the second function is to enhance the release of newly formed virions from the cell surface. Vpu accomplishes these two functions through two distinct mechanisms. In the case of CD4, Vpu acts as a molecular adaptor to connect CD4 to an E3 ubiquitin ligase complex resulting in CD4 degradation by cellular proteasomes. This requires signals located in Vpu’s cytoplasmic domain. Enhancement of virus release on the other hand involves the neutralization of a cellular host factor, BST-2 (also known as CD317, HM1.24, or tetherin) and requires Vpu’s TM domain. however, the exact mechanism of how Vpu counteracts BST-2 is still unclear. In the absence of Vpu, tetherin binds to the viral envelope and ties it to the cell membrane and other viral particles, impeding release of the viral particles. Recent data suggest that the BST-2 transmembrane domain is crucial for interference by Vpu. The interaction of Vpu and BST-2 results in the downregulation of BST-2 from the cell surface.

BST-2, which is an interferon (IFN)-inducible cell surface protein, appears to “tether” HIV to the cell in the absence of Vpu. BST-2 is a heavily glycosylated 29- to 33-kDa integral membrane protein with both a transmembrane domain and a putative glycosylphosphatidylinositol anchor (GPI). At the cell surface, BST2 resides in lipid rafts through the GPI anchor, whereas its TM domain lies outside them, indirectly interacting with the actin cytoskeleton. Vpu primary site of action is the plasma membrane, where this protein targets cell-surface BST-2 through their mutual TM-to-TM binding, leading to lysosomes, partially dependent on βTrCP.

== Structure ==
Viral protein "u" (Vpu) is an oligomeric, 81-amino acid type I membrane protein (16 kDa) that is translated from vpu-env bicistronic mRNA. The N-terminus of Vpu encoding the transmembrane (TM) anchor represents an active domain important for the regulation of virus release but not CD4 degradation. The C-terminal cytoplasmic domain (54 residues) that contains a pair of serine residues (at positions 52 and 56) constitutively phosphorylated by casein kinase 2. The phosphorylation of two serine residues in the cytoplasmic domain is critical for CD4 degradation in the ER. Based on 2D 1H NMR spectroscopy of a peptide corresponding to the cytoplasmic domain of Vpu, it was proposed that the cytoplasmic domain of Vpu contains two α-helical domains, helix-1 and helix-2, which are connected by an unstructured region containing the two conserved phosphoseryl residues. In addition, computer models predict a third α-helical domain in the transmembrane domain of Vpu, which could play an important role in the formation of ion channels.

== See also ==
- HIV genome organization
- Viral life cycle
