= KIAA1958 =

Protein-coding gene in the species Homo sapiens

Identifiers
- Aliases: KIAA1958
- External IDs: OMIM: 617390; MGI: 2442164; GeneCards: KIAA1958

Gene location (Human)
Chr.	Chromosome 9 (human)
Band	9q32	Start	112,486,827 bp
Band	9q32	End	112,669,397 bp

Gene location (Mouse)
Chr.	Chromosome 4 (mouse)
Band	4|4 B3	Start	59,626,211 bp
Band	4|4 B3	End	59,761,439 bp
RNA expression pattern
Bgee	Human / Mouse (ortholog); Top expressed in: thalamus; gonad; testicle; inferior ganglion of vagus nerve; corpus callosum; retinal pigment epithelium; renal medulla; ventral tegmental area; secondary oocyte; pars reticulata / Top expressed in: otolith organ; utricle; Rostral migratory stream; external carotid artery; internal carotid artery; substantia nigra; trigeminal ganglion; renal corpuscle; lumbar subsegment of spinal cord; retinal pigment epithelium; More reference expression data
BioGPS	n/a
Gene ontology
Molecular function	protein binding; DNA-binding transcription factor activity, RNA polymerase II-specific; DNA binding
Cellular component	cytoplasm; nucleoplasm
Biological process	regulation of transcription by RNA polymerase II
Sources:Amigo / QuickGO
Orthologs
Databases	NCBI: entry; OMA: entry
Species	Human	Mouse
Entrez	158405	230259
Ensembl	ENSG00000165185	ENSMUSG00000045071
UniProt	Q8N8K9	Q8C4P0
RefSeq (mRNA)	NM_001287036; NM_001287038; NM_133465	NM_001015681; NM_153158
RefSeq (protein)	NP_001273965; NP_001273967; NP_597722	NP_001015681; NP_694798
Location (UCSC)	Chr 9: 112.49 – 112.67 Mb	Chr 4: 59.63 – 59.76 Mb
PubMed search
- Wikidata
View/Edit Human	View/Edit Mouse

Uncharacterized protein KIAA1958 is a protein that in humans is encoded by the KIAA1958 gene. Orthologs of KIAA1958 go as far back in evolution to chordates, although, it is closer in homology to primates than any other orthologs. KIAA1958 has no known paralogs.

== Gene ==
KIAA1958 is located on the long arm of chromosome 9 (9.q32) in humans on the plus strand from 115249248 to 115427597. Its mRNA has 2683 bp. The gene has these neighbors on chromosome 9:

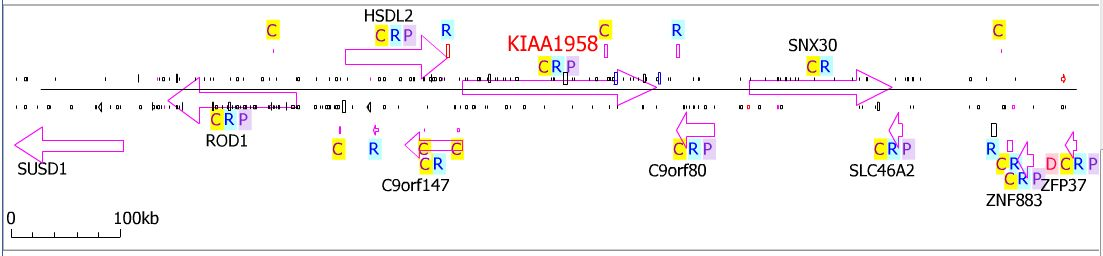
KIAA1958 gene neighbors

HSDL2: Hydroxysteroid dehydrogenase-like protein 2 plays a role in nucleotide binding, oxidoreductase activity, and sterol binding.

C9orf147: Chromosome 9 open reading frame 147 has an unknown function.

C9orf80: Chromosome 9 open reading frame 80 is a component of the SOSS complex, a multiprotein complex that functions downstream of the MRN complex to promote DNA repair and G2/M checkpoint. The SOSS complex associates with single-stranded DNA at DNA lesions and influences diverse endpoints in the cellular DNA damage response including cell cycle checkpoint activation, recombinational repair and maintenance of genomic stability.

SNX30: Sorting nexin-30 may be linked to phosphatidylinositol binding.

== Expression ==
KIAA1958 is expressed in the highest quantities in the larynx as proposed by EST. The highest expression in developmental stage is the blastocyst and for health state, it is most found in uterine tumors. Data from NCBI GEO Profile shows that KIAA1958 expression includes many of the tissue types in the human body. Using EMBL-EBI, KIAA1958 was found to be overexpressed in pseudopod RNA during the migration of the metastatic cancer cells. KIAA1958 was also overexpressed in Stat5/ab and stat 3 which are transcription factors reported to be critical for the growth and viability of prostate cancer cells and both the embryonic stem cell and the pluripotent stem cell.

== Protein ==
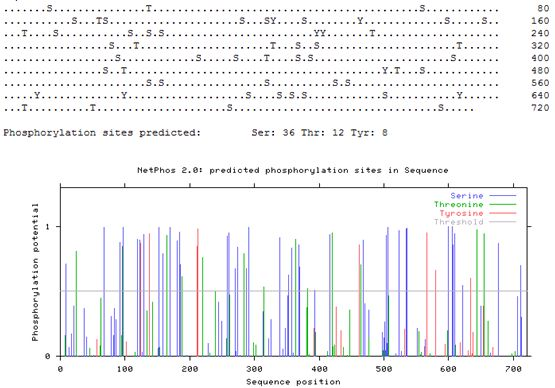
KIAA1958 predicted phosphorylated sites

KIAA1958 is composed of 716 amino acids and weighs 79212 Da with an iso-electric point of 6.375. Although not much is known about the KIAA1958 protein, scientific predictions have been made using supercomputers for predictions of KIAA1958's structure and function. KIAA1958 undergoes post-translational modifications. The most interesting modification is phosphorylation. In comparison to other proteins, KIAA1958 has a substantially significant amount of serines phosphorylated during post-translational modification. 36 serines are predicted to be phosphorylated.

=== Structure ===
PELE on SDSC Biology WorkBench is supercomputer that is able to predict secondary structure of the KIAA1958 protein. According to this tool, the protein's secondary structure is a combination of alpha helices and beta sheets, in almost equal amount and spread out almost evenly throughout the protein.

=== Interactions ===
There is no known proof that KIAA1958 interacts with any other proteins at this time.

== Homology ==
Genus and Species	Common name	Accession number	Seq. length	Seq. identity	Seq. similarity
Pan troglodytes	Chimpanzee	XM_528391	7945 bp	99%	99%
Mus musculus	Mouse	BAC38268	719 a	97%	98%
Callithrix jacchus	Common marmoset	XM_002743204	2346bp	97%	82%
Pongo abelii	Sumatran Orangutan	XM_002820112	1120bp	96%	4%
Sus scrofa	Wild boar	XM_003122070	2502 bp	93%	81%
Ailuropoda melanoleuca	Giant Panda	XM_002925938	2151 bp	85%	91%
Nomascus leucogenys	White cheeked gibbon	XM_003263945	950 bp	93%	5%
Oryctolagus cuniculus	European rabbit	XM_002707990	2223 bp	93%	43%
Loxodonta africana	African bush elephant	XM_003407521	2388 bp	93%	80%
Cricetulus griseus	Chinese hamster	XM_003505508	2534 bp	92%	42%
Equus caballus	Horse	XM_001916302	2536 bp	91%	93%
Bos taurus	Cow	XM_876102.5	2480 bp	91%	81%
Rattus norvegicus	Rat	XM_002726532	1364 bp	91%	36%
Cavia porcellus	Guinea pig	XM_003463791	2217 bp	91%	43%
Monodelphis domestica	Opossum	XM_001375976	2217 bp	78%	41%
Branchiostoma floridae	Lancelet	XP_002611438	719 a	29%	48%
Amphimedon queenslandica	Sponge	XP_003390994	388 a	25%	48%
Acyrthosiphon pisum	Pea aphid	XP_001943720	1197 aa	24%	43%
Oikopleura dioica	Chordate	CBY34656	629 a	22%	43%
Ciona intestinalis	Vase tunicate	XP_002125964	1004 aa	23%	43%
Xenopus (silurana) tropicalis	Western Clawed frog	AAI61073	679 a	23%	43%
Halocynthia roretzi	Sea pineapple	BAB40645	980 a	23%	45%
