= Cyclin B3 =

Cell cycle protein

CCNB3

Identifiers
- Aliases: CCNB3, cyclin B3, CYCB3
- External IDs: OMIM: 300456; MGI: 2183443; GeneCards: CCNB3

Gene location (Human)
Chr.	X chromosome (human)
Band	Xp11.22	Start	50,202,713 bp
Band	Xp11.22	End	50,351,914 bp

Gene location (Mouse)
Chr.	X chromosome (mouse)
Band	X|X A1.1	Start	6,845,891 bp
Band	X|X A1.1	End	6,907,858 bp
RNA expression pattern
Bgee	Human / Mouse (ortholog); Top expressed in: gonad; testicle; secondary oocyte; right testis; left testis; C1 segment; ventricular zone; right uterine tube; olfactory zone of nasal mucosa; islet of Langerhans / Top expressed in: seminiferous tubule; blastocyst; zygote; secondary oocyte; primary oocyte; morula; spermatid; spermatocyte; ovary; More reference expression data
BioGPS	n/a
Gene ontology
Molecular function	protein binding; protein kinase binding; protein kinase activity; cyclin-dependent protein serine/threonine kinase regulator activity
Cellular component	nucleus; nuclear speck; cyclin-dependent protein kinase holoenzyme complex; cytoplasm; centrosome
Biological process	regulation of cyclin-dependent protein serine/threonine kinase activity; cell cycle; cell division; meiosis; regulation of G2/M transition of mitotic cell cycle; mitotic cell cycle; protein phosphorylation; regulation of mitotic nuclear division; positive regulation of cell population proliferation; positive regulation of cell cycle; mitotic cell cycle phase transition
Sources:Amigo / QuickGO
Orthologs
Databases	NCBI: entry; OMA: entry
Species	Human	Mouse
Entrez	85417	209091
Ensembl	ENSG00000147082	ENSMUSG00000051592
UniProt	Q8WWL7	Q810T2
RefSeq (mRNA)	NM_033031; NM_033670; NM_033671	NM_183015
RefSeq (protein)	NP_149020; NP_391990	NP_898836
Location (UCSC)	Chr X: 50.2 – 50.35 Mb	Chr X: 6.85 – 6.91 Mb
PubMed search
- Wikidata
View/Edit Human	View/Edit Mouse

G2/mitotic-specific cyclin-B3 is a protein encoded by the CCNB3 gene located on the X chromosome in humans. Cyclin B3 has features of both A type cyclins and B type cyclins and is a distinct subfamily of B type cyclins conserved across many species. However, human cyclin B3 is considerably larger than all other previously characterized invertebrate or vertebrate cyclin B3s. Unlike cyclin B1 and cyclin B2, it is solely expressed in germ cells in mammals, with a significant role in meiosis and gamete formation.

== Structure ==
Cyclin B3 was originally identified in chickens from cDNA as a 403 amino acid protein. It has roughly 30% similarity to chicken and Xenopus B and A type cyclins. The cyclin box of chicken cyclin B3 has 15 residues different from the consensus sequence for B type cyclins and 22 residues different from the consensus sequence for A type cyclins. The destruction box sequence for chicken cyclin B3 also differs from the expected sequence: it contains a phenylalanine rather than a leucine. The nuclear localization sequence (NLS) of chicken cyclin B3 appears to be in the 26 C-terminal residues, consistent with A type cyclins.

Human cyclin B3 is the largest cyclin, 1395 amino acids long, due to large variable domain (contained in exon 8) between the destruction box and cyclin box. There are indications of alternative splicing that alters localization to the cytoplasm.

== Expression ==
Cyclin B3 is nearly entirely localized to the nucleus and cycles similarly to other B cyclins in somatic cells. In humans it is primarily expressed in germ cells in the testis, somewhat contradictory to its observed function in oocyte meiosis in other organisms.

== Function ==
When it was initially characterized in HeLa cells, human cyclin B3 was found to associate with CDK2 but it did not significantly spur histone H1 kinase activity as is common with other cyclin-CDK complexes. However, further research has shown that cyclin B3 associates with CDK1 rather than CDK2 (as seen with chicken cyclin B3). In HeLa cells, cyclin B3 was observed to degrade during the metaphase-anaphase transition when it had a complete destruction box. Accumulation of cyclin B3 was also shown to induce the beginning of mitosis early and prevent exit from M phase by arresting cells in anaphase.

=== Role in mitosis ===
Cyclin B3 has primarily mitotic functionality in Caenorhabditis elegans where it is primarily localized to the nucleus and is necessary for chromatid separation. Cyclin B3 is especially important in early C. elegans embryos where it again governs chromatid separation as well as kinetochore and microtubule assembly. It additionally appears to drive rapid mitosis in early C. elegans embryos, roughly three times faster than mitosis in adult worms.

=== Role in meiosis and gamete production ===
==== Oogenesis ====
Cyclin B3 has been investigated in the context of oogenesis as its initial mammalian characterization found mRNA expression in fetal ovaries but not adult ovaries. Female mice with null or severe loss of function mutations to both copies of cyclin B3 (Ccnb3^{-/-}) are sterile: most ccnb3^{-/-} oocytes do not form polar bodies. Cyclin B3-CDK1 complexes promote the degradation of Anaphase Promoting Complex/Cyclosome (APC/C) substrates securin and cyclin B1, which potentially leads to the onset of anaphase I. Cyclin B3 is also degraded as the oocyte leaves meiosis I.

Cyclin B3-CDK1 complexes also phosphorylate Emi2, an APC/C inhibitor, flagging it for degradation which maintains APC/C activity. Importantly, cyclin B3 is not present during meiosis II, which allows for arrest in metaphase II. This pattern of degradation, different from cyclins B1 and B2, is potentially the result of its destruction box sequence which does not match cyclins B1 and B2.

Cyclin B3 seems to maintain this key function in oogenesis in other organisms like Drosophila, where Cyclin B3 acts directly on APC/C, and Caenorhabditis elegans. Interestingly, injection of frog (Xenopus laevis), zebrafish (Danio rerio), or fly (Drosophila) cyclin B3 mRNA rescued Ccnb3^{-/-} mutant fertility in mice, suggesting that cyclin B3 is highly conserved amongst all animals.

==== Spermatogenesis ====
As its initial mammalian characterization found cyclin B3 is primarily expressed in human testis and implicated in meiosis. Its role in spermatogenesis has been studied in mouse models. Cyclin B3 mRNA is observed beginning in prophase I, and continues to accumulate in leptotene and zygotene stages, decreasing as sperm cells enter the pachytene stage. When cyclin B3 expression is artificially extended until the end of meiosis, spermatogenesis is negatively affected. This extended expression leads to decrease in sperm counts, cells in seminiferous tubules with abnormal morphology and increased instances of apoptosis, and resulted in no functional gametes.

Interestingly, male mice and flies with null or severe loss of function mutations of cyclin B3 (Ccbn3^{-/Y}) retain their fertility and exhibit normal spermatogenesis which shows that cyclin B3 is not necessary for spermatogenesis and has some redundant functionality in males.

== Cancer ==
Despite its primary role in meiosis, cyclin B3 has been implicated in cancer, first described in bone sarcomas as a fusion of BCOR and CCNB3. Tumors with this mutation are relatively rare but more prevalent in adolescents and young adults as well and significantly more common in men than women. No reasons for this demographic breakdown have been proposed.
