= CCNY (disambiguation) =

CCNY is the City College of New York.

CCNY may also refer to:

- Carnegie Corporation of New York
- Criminal Court of New York
- Cyclin-Y, encoded by the CCNY gene
