= Novak–Tyson model =

The Novak–Tyson Model is a non-linear dynamics framework developed in the context of cell-cycle control by Bela Novak and John J. Tyson. It is a prevalent theoretical model that describes a hysteretic, bistable bifurcation of which many biological systems have been shown to express.

== Historical background ==
Bela Novak and John Tyson came from the Department of Biology at the Virginia Polytechnic Institute and State University in Blacksburg, Virginia, when this model was first published in the Journal of Cell Science in 1993.

In 1990, two key papers were published that identified and characterized important dynamic relationships between cyclin and MPF in interphase-arrested frog egg extracts. The first was Solomon's 1990 Cell paper, titled "Cyclin activation of p34cdc2" and the second was Felix's 1990 Nature paper, titled "Triggering of cyclin degradation in interphase extracts of amphibian eggs of cdc2 kinase". Solomon's paper showed a distinct cyclin concentration threshold for the activation of MPF. Felix's paper looked at cyclin B degradation in these extracts and found that MPF degrades cyclin B in a concentration dependent and time-delayed manner.

In response to these observations, three competing models were published in the next year, 1991, by Norel and Agur, Goldbeter, and Tyson. These competing theories all attempted to model the experimental observations seen in the 1990 papers regarding the cyclin-MPF network.

=== The Norel and Agur model ===
Norel and Agur's model proposes a mechanism where cyclin catalytically drives the production of MPF, which in turn autocatalyzes. This model assumes that MPF activates cyclin degradation via APC activation, and it decouples cyclin degradation from MPF destruction. However, this model is unable to recreate the observed cyclin dependent MPF activity relationship seen in Solomon's 1990 paper, as it shows no upper steady-state level of MPF activity.

=== Goldbeter model ===
Goldbeter proposed a model where cyclin also catalytically activates MPF, but without an autocatalytic, positive feedback loop. The model describes a two-step process, where MPF first activates the APC, and then the APC drives cyclin degradation. When graphing the MPF activity with respect to cyclin concentration, the model shows a sigmoidal shape, with a hypersensitive, threshold region similar to what was observed by Solomon. However, this model depicts an effectively asymptotic plateau behavior at cyclin concentrations above the threshold, whereas the observed curve shows a steady increase in MPF activity at cyclin concentrations above the threshold.

=== Tyson model ===
In Tyson's 1991 model, cyclin is a stoichiometric activator of Cdc2, as cyclin binds with phosphorylated Cdc2 to form preMPF, which is activated by Cdc25 to generate MPF. Because Cdc25 itself is also activated by MPF, the conversion of preMPF to active MPF is a self-amplifying process in this model. Tyson neglected the role of MPF in activating the APC, assuming that only a phosphorylated form of cyclin was rapidly degraded. Tyson's model predicts an S-shaped curve, which is phenotypically consistent with Solomon's experimental results. However, this model generates additional lower turning point behavior on the S-curve that implies hysteresis when interpreted as a threshold.

The Novak–Tyson model, first published in the paper titled "Numerical analysis of a comprehensive model of M-phase control in Xenopus oocyte extracts and intact embryos", builds on the Goldbeter and Tyson 1991 models in order to generate a unifying theory, encapsulating the observed dynamics of the cyclin-MPF relationship.

== Model ==
The model proposes a complex set of feedback relationships that are mathematically defined by a series of rate constants and ordinary differential equations. It employs concepts seen in the previous models such as stoichiometric binding of Cdc2 and cyclin B, positive feedback loops through Cdc25 and Wee1, and delayed activation by MPF of the APC, but includes additional reactions such as that of Wee1 and Cdc25. The result is a non-linear dynamic system with a similar S-shaped curve from Tyson's 1991 model. In the process, this model makes four key predictions.

=== Discontinuous bistable hysteresis ===
According to the Novak–Tyson model, rather than describing Solomon's observations as a sigmoidal switch as seen in the Goldbeter model, the threshold behavior of cyclin concentration dependent MPF activity is instead, a discontinuity of a bistable system. Moreover, due to the S-shape dynamics, the Novak–Tyson model additionally predicts that the cyclin concentration threshold for activation is higher than the cyclin concentration threshold for inactivation; that is, this model predicts a dynamically hysteretic behavior.

=== Critical slowing down ===
Since the Novak–Tyson model predicts that the observed threshold is actually a discontinuity in the system dynamics, it additionally predicts a critical slowing down behavior near the threshold, which is a characteristic behavior of discontinuous bistable systems.

=== Biochemical regulation ===
Since the model predicts that MPF activation at the interphase-to-mitosis transition is governed by the turning point of an S-shaped curve, Novak and Tyson suggest that transition-delaying checkpoint signals biochemically move the turning point to larger values of cyclin B concentration.

=== Phosphatase regulation ===
Novak and Tyson predict that unreplicated DNA interferes with M-phase initiation by activating the phosphatases that oppose MPF in the positive feedback loops. This prediction suggests a possible role for regulated serine/threonine protein phosphatases in cell cycle control.

== Model validation ==
At the time of publishing, the predictions from the paper were all experimentally untested and were based only off the signal pathways and mathematical modeling proposed by Novak and Tyson. However, since then, two papers have experimentally validated three of the four predictions listed above, namely the discontinuous bistable hysteresis, critical slowing down, and biochemical regulation predictions.

== Weaknesses ==
According to the Novak and Tyson, this model, as with any biologically detailed, mathematically driven model, is heavily reliant on parameter estimation, especially given the mathematical complexity for this particular model. Ultimately these parameters are fit to experimental data, which is inherently susceptible to the compounded reliability of various experiments measuring various parameters.
