= Meiotic recombination checkpoint =

The meiotic recombination checkpoint monitors meiotic recombination during meiosis, and blocks the entry into metaphase I if recombination is not efficiently processed.

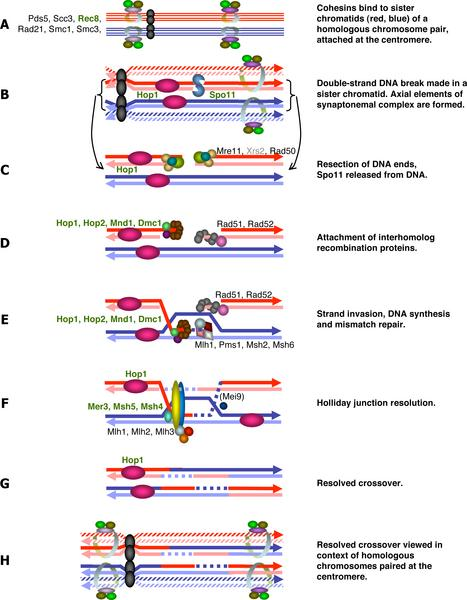
Spo11 catalyzes a double strand break (DSB) in one of the two homologous chromosomes to induce meiotic recombination. The repair of these DSBs are monitored at a DSB-dependent meiotic recombination checkpoint while at the DSB-independent meiotic recombination checkpoint the asynapsis of each homolog pair is examined.

Generally speaking, the cell cycle regulation of meiosis is similar to that of mitosis. As in the mitotic cycle, these transitions are regulated by combinations of different gene regulatory factors, the cyclin-Cdk complex and the anaphase-promoting complex (APC). The first major regulatory transition occurs in late G1, when the start of meiotic cycle is activated by Ime1 instead of Cln3/Cdk1 in mitosis. The second major transition occurs at the entry into metaphase I. The main purpose of this step is to make sure that DNA replication has completed without error so that spindle pole bodies can separate. This event is triggered by the activation of M-Cdk in late prophase I. Then the spindle assembly checkpoint examines the attachment of microtubules at kinetochores, followed by initiation of metaphase I by APC^{Cdc20}. The special chromosome separation in meiosis, homologous chromosomes separation in meiosis I and chromatids separation in meiosis II, requires special tension between homologous chromatids and non-homologous chromatids for distinguishing microtubule attachment and it relies on the programmed DNA double strand break (DSB) and repair in prophase I. Therefore meiotic recombination checkpoint can be a kind of DNA damage response at specific time spot. On the other hand, the meiotic recombination checkpoint also makes sure that meiotic recombination does happen in every pair of homologs.

== DSB-dependent pathway ==
The abrupt onset of M-Cdk in late prophase I depends on the positive transcription regulation feedback loop consisting of Ime2, Ndt80 and Cdk/cyclin complex. However the activation of M-Cdk is controlled by the general phosphorylation switch Wee1/Cdc25. Wee1 activity is high in early prophase I and the accumulation of Cdc25 activates M-Cdk by direct phosphorylation and marking Wee1 to be degraded. Meiotic recombination may begin with a double-strand break, either induced by Spo11 or by other endogenous or exogenous causes of DNA damage. These DNA breaks must be repaired before metaphase I. and these DSBs must be repaired before metaphase I. The cell monitor these DSBs via ATM pathway, in which Cdc25 is suppressed when DSB lesion is detected. This pathway is the same as classical DNA damage response and is the part we know the best in meiotic recombination checkpoint.

== DSB-independent pathway ==
The DSB-independent pathway was proposed when people studied spo11 mutant cells in some species and found that these Spo11 cells could not process to metaphase I even in the absence of DSB. The direct purpose of these DSBs is to help with the condensation of chromosomes. Even though the initial homolog paring in early leptotene is just random interactions, the further progression into presynaptic alignment depends on the formation of double strand breaks and single strand transfer complexes. Therefore the unsynapsed chromosomes in Spo11 cells can be a target of checkpoint. An AAA–adenosine triphosphatase (AAA-ATPase) was found to be essential in this pathway. but the mechanism is not yet clear. Some other studies also drew sex body formation into attention, and the signaling could be either structure based or transcription regulation such as meiotic sex chromosome inactivation. Under this cascade, failure to synapse will maintain the gene expression from sex chromosomes and some products may inhibit cell cycle progression. Meiotic sex chromosome inactivation only happens in male, which may partially be the reason why only Spo11 mutant spermatocytes but not oocytes fail to transition from prophase I to metaphase I. However the asynapsis does not happen only within sex chromosomes, and such transcription regulation was suspended until it was further expanded to all the chromosomes as meiotic silencing of unsynapsed chromatin, but the effector gene is not found yet.

== Meiotic checkpoint protein kinases CHEK1 and CHEK2 ==
The central role in meiosis of human and mouse CHEK1 and CHEK2 and their orthologs in Saccharomyces cerevisiae, Caenorhabditis elegans, Schizosaccharomyces pombe and Drosophila has been reviewed by MacQueen and Hochwagen and Subramanian and Hochwagen. During meiotic recombination in human and mouse, CHEK1 protein kinase is important for integrating DNA damage repair with cell cycle arrest. CHEK1 is expressed in the testes and associates with meiotic synaptonemal complexes during the zygonema and pachynema stages. CHEK1 likely acts as an integrator for ATM and ATR signals and in monitoring meiotic recombination. In mouse oocytes CHEK1 appears to be indispensable for prophase I arrest and to function at the G2/M checkpoint.

CHEK2 regulates cell cycle progression and spindle assembly during mouse oocyte maturation and early embryo development. Although CHEK2 is a down stream effector of the ATM kinase that responds primarily to double-strand breaks it can also be activated by ATR (ataxia-telangiectasia and Rad3 related) kinase that responds primarily to single-strand breaks. In mouse, CHEK2 is essential for DNA damage surveillance in female meiosis. The response of oocytes to DNA double-strand break damage involves a pathway hierarchy in which ATR kinase signals to CHEK2 which then activates p53 and p63 proteins.

In the fruitfly Drosophila, irradiation of germ line cells generates double-strand breaks that result in cell cycle arrest and apoptosis. The Drosophila CHEK2 ortholog mnk and the p53 ortholog dp53 are required for much of the cell death observed in early oogenesis when oocyte selection and meiotic recombination occur.

== Meiosis-specific Transcription factor Ndt80 ==
Ndt80 is a meiosis-specific transcription factor required for successful completion of meiosis and spore formation. The protein recognizes and binds to the middle sporulation element (MSE) 5'-C[AG]CAAA[AT]-3' in the promoter region of stage-specific genes that are required for progression through meiosis and sporulation. The DNA-binding domain of Ndt80 has been isolated, and the structure reveals that this protein is a member of the Ig-fold family of transcription factors. Ndt80 also competes with the repressor SUM1 for binding to promoters containing MSEs.

=== Transitions in yeast ===
When a mutation inactivates Ndt80 in budding yeast, meiotic cells display a prolonged delay in late pachytene, the third stage of prophase. The cells display intact synaptonemal complexes but eventually arrest in the diffuse chromatin stage that follows pachytene. This checkpoint-mediated arrest prevents later events from occurring until earlier events have been executed successfully and prevents chromosome missegregation.

=== Role in cell cycle progression ===
NDt80 is crucial for the completion of prophase and entry into meiosis 1, as it stimulates the expression of a large number of middle meiotic genes. Ndt80 is regulated through transcriptional and post-translational mechanisms (i.e. phosphorylation).

==== Interaction with Clb1 ====
Ndt80 stimulates the expression of the B-type cyclin Clb-1, which greatly interacts with Cdk1 during meiotic divisions. Active complexes of Clb-1 with Cdk1 play a large role in triggering the events of the first meiotic division, and their activity is restricted to meiosis 1.

==== Interaction with Ime2 ====
Ndt80 stimulates expression of itself and expression of protein kinase Ime2, both of which feedback to further stimulate Ndt80. This increased amount of Ndt80 protein further enhances the transcription of target genes. Early in meiosis 1, Ime2 activity rises and is required for the normal accumulation and activity of Ndt80. However, if Ndt80 is expressed prematurely, it will initially accumulate in an unmodified form. Ime2 can then also act as a meiosis-specific kinase that phosphorylates Ndt80, resulting in fully activated Ndt80.

==== Expression of Plk ====
Ndt80 stimulates the expression of the gene that encodes polo-like kinase, Plk. This protein is activated in late pachytene and is needed for crossover formation and partial loss of cohesion from chromosome arms. Plk is also both necessary and sufficient to trigger exit from pachytene points.

==== Recombination model ====
The meiotic recombination checkpoint operates in response to defects in meiotic recombination and chromosome synapsis, potentially arresting cells before entry into meiotic divisions. Because recombination is initiated by double stranded breaks (DSBs) at certain regions of the genome, entry into Meiosis 1 must be delayed until the DSBs are repaired. The meiosis-specific kinase Mek1 plays an important role in this and recently, it has been discovered that Mek1 is able to phosphorylate Ndt80 independently of IME2. This phosphorylation, however, is inhibitory and prevents Ndt80 from binding to MSEs in the presence of DSBs.

=== Roles outside of cell cycle progression ===
==== Heterokaryon Incompatibility ====
Heterokaryon Incompatibility (HI) has been likened to a fungal immune system; it is a non-self recognition mechanism that is ubiquitous among filamentous members of the phylum Ascomycota of the fungal kingdom. Vib-1 is an Ndt80 homologue in Neurospora crassa and is required for HI in this species. It has been found that mutations at the vib1 locus suppress non-self recognition, and VIB-1 is required for the production of downstream effectors associated with HI, such as extracellular proteases.

==== Female sexual development ====
Studies have indicated that Ndt80 homologues also play a role in female sexual development in fungi species other than the more commonly studied Saccharomyces cerevisiae. Mutations in vib-1 have been found to affect the timing and development of female reproductive structures prior to fertilization.

=== Role in Cancer ===
Although usually characterized in yeast and other fungi, the DNA-binding domain of Ndt80 is homologous to a number of proteins in higher eukaryotes and the residues used for binding are highly conserved. In humans, the Ndt80 homologue C11orf9 is highly expressed in invasive or metastatic tumor cells, suggesting potential usage as a target molecule in cancer treatment. However, not much progress has been made on this front in recent years.

== See also ==
- Cell cycle checkpoint
