= CCNI =

CCNI may refer to:

- Computational Center for Nanotechnology Innovations, supercomputing centre at the Rensselaer Polytechnic Institute, USA
- Charity Commission for Northern Ireland, government body regulating charities in Northern Ireland
- CCNI (gene), also known as Cyclin 1
- CCNI S.A., Compañía Chilena de Navegación Interoceánica S.A. (Chilean Interoceanic navigation company)
- Comité consultatif national de l'immunisation (CCNI), French name of the National Advisory Committee on Immunization (NACI) of Canada
