= G2E3 =

Protein-coding gene in the species Homo sapiens

Identifiers
- Aliases: G2E3, KIAA1333, PHF7B, G2/M-phase specific E3 ubiquitin protein ligase
- External IDs: OMIM: 611299; MGI: 2444298; GeneCards: G2E3
Enzyme activity
EC #	BRENDA	ExPASy	KEGG	MetaCyc
2.3.2.26	↗	↗	↗	↗

Gene location (Human)
Chr.	Chromosome 14 (human)
Band	14q12	Start	30,559,158 bp
Band	14q12	End	30,620,064 bp

Gene location (Mouse)
Chr.	Chromosome 12 (mouse)
Band	12|12 B3	Start	51,394,844 bp
Band	12|12 B3	End	51,423,769 bp
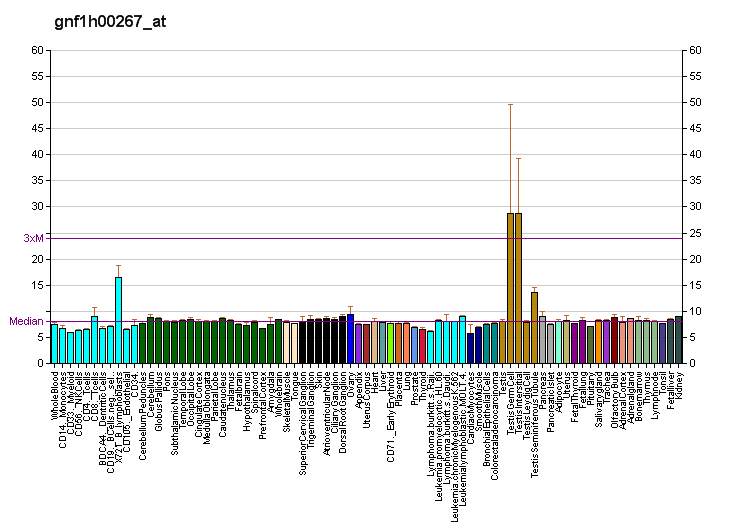
RNA expression pattern
Bgee	Human / Mouse (ortholog); Top expressed in: sperm; testicle; gonad; ventricular zone; right testis; left testis; ganglionic eminence; pancreatic epithelial cell; epithelium of colon; Achilles tendon / Top expressed in: hand; Rostral migratory stream; superior cervical ganglion; epiblast; tail of embryo; genital tubercle; primitive streak; maxillary prominence; medial ganglionic eminence; spermatid; More reference expression data
BioGPS	More reference expression data
Gene ontology
Molecular function	ubiquitin-protein transferase activity; protein binding; metal ion binding; transferase activity
Cellular component	cytoplasm; nucleolus; nucleus; cytosol; intracellular membrane-bounded organelle
Biological process	multicellular organism development; protein ubiquitination; apoptotic process
Sources:Amigo / QuickGO
Orthologs
Databases	NCBI: entry; OMA: entry
Species	Human	Mouse
Entrez	55632	217558
Ensembl	ENSG00000092140	ENSMUSG00000035293
UniProt	Q7L622	Q5RJY2
RefSeq (mRNA)	NM_001308097; NM_017769	NM_001015099; NM_001167963; NM_001167964
RefSeq (protein)	NP_001295026; NP_060239	NP_001015099; NP_001161435; NP_001161436
Location (UCSC)	Chr 14: 30.56 – 30.62 Mb	Chr 12: 51.39 – 51.42 Mb
PubMed search
- Wikidata
View/Edit Human	View/Edit Mouse

G2/M phase-specific E3 ubiquitin-protein ligase is an enzyme that in humans is encoded by the G2E3 gene. The G2E3 protein is a E3 ubiquitin ligase which is highly expressed during the G2/M phase of mitosis.
