= Cyclin-P =

Protein-coding gene in humans

CCNP

Identifiers
- Aliases: CCNP, cyclin N-terminal domain containing 2, cyclin P, CNTD2
- External IDs: GeneCards: CCNP

Gene location (Human)
| Chr. | Chromosome 19 (human) |
| Band | 19q13.2 | Start | 40,222,208 bp |
| Band | 19q13.2 | End | 40,226,697 bp |
RNA expression pattern
| Bgee | Human / Mouse (ortholog); Top expressed in: testicle; oocyte; right hemisphere of cerebellum; secondary oocyte; gonad; right lobe of liver; pituitary gland; right uterine tube; anterior pituitary; skeletal muscle tissue / n/a; More reference expression data |
| BioGPS | n/a |
Gene ontology
| Molecular function | protein kinase activity; cyclin-dependent protein serine/threonine kinase regulator activity; protein kinase binding |
| Cellular component | cyclin-dependent protein kinase holoenzyme complex; nucleus; cytoplasm |
| Biological process | regulation of cyclin-dependent protein serine/threonine kinase activity; mitotic cell cycle; protein phosphorylation; regulation of mitotic nuclear division; positive regulation of cell population proliferation; positive regulation of cell cycle; mitotic cell cycle phase transition |
Sources:Amigo / QuickGO
Orthologs
| Databases | NCBI: entry; OMA: entry |
| Species | Human | Mouse |
| Entrez | 79935 | n/a |
| Ensembl | ENSG00000105219 | n/a |
| UniProt | Q9H8S5 | n/a |
| RefSeq (mRNA) | NM_024877 | n/a |
| RefSeq (protein) | NP_079153 | n/a |
| Location (UCSC) | Chr 19: 40.22 – 40.23 Mb | n/a |
| PubMed search | | n/a |
- Wikidata
| View/Edit Human |

Cyclin-P is a protein that in humans is encoded by the CCNP gene (previously CNTD2). Research suggests that this protein functions as a cyclin and is involved in regulating cell proliferation and migration.
