= CCNL2 =

Protein-coding gene in humans

Identifiers
- Aliases: CCNL2, ANIA-6B, CCNM, CCNS, HCLA-ISO, HLA-ISO, PCEE, SB138, cyclin L2
- External IDs: OMIM: 613482; MGI: 1927119; GeneCards: CCNL2

Gene location (Human)
Chr.	Chromosome 1 (human)
Band	1p36.33	Start	1,385,711 bp
Band	1p36.33	End	1,399,335 bp

Gene location (Mouse)
Chr.	Chromosome 4 (mouse)
Band	4 E2|4 87.47 cM	Start	155,896,946 bp
Band	4 E2|4 87.47 cM	End	155,909,000 bp
RNA expression pattern
Bgee	Human / Mouse (ortholog); Top expressed in: right uterine tube; right hemisphere of cerebellum; right ovary; left ovary; body of uterus; canal of the cervix; left lobe of thyroid gland; right lobe of thyroid gland; gastric mucosa; left uterine tube / Top expressed in: granulocyte; medullary collecting duct; body of femur; Ileal epithelium; fossa; lymph node; condyle; conjunctival fornix; lobe of cerebellum; trachea; More reference expression data
BioGPS	n/a
Gene ontology
Molecular function	cyclin-dependent protein serine/threonine kinase regulator activity; protein binding
Cellular component	nucleus; cyclin-dependent protein kinase holoenzyme complex; intracellular membrane-bounded organelle; nuclear speck; nucleoplasm
Biological process	regulation of transcription, DNA-templated; positive regulation of transcription by RNA polymerase II; positive regulation of phosphorylation of RNA polymerase II C-terminal domain; positive regulation of cyclin-dependent protein serine/threonine kinase activity; transcription, DNA-templated; regulation of cyclin-dependent protein serine/threonine kinase activity; regulation of transcription by RNA polymerase II
Sources:Amigo / QuickGO
Orthologs
Databases	NCBI: entry; OMA: entry
Species	Human	Mouse
Entrez	81669	56036
Ensembl	ENSG00000221978	ENSMUSG00000029068
UniProt	Q96S94	Q9JJA7
RefSeq (mRNA)	NM_001039577; NM_001144867; NM_001144868; NM_030937; NM_001320153 NM_001320155; NM_001350497; NM_001350498; NM_001350499; NM_001350500	NM_018856; NM_207678; NM_001401306
RefSeq (protein)	NP_001034666; NP_001307082; NP_001307084; NP_112199; NP_001337426 NP_001337427; NP_001337428; NP_001337429	NP_997561; NP_001388235
Location (UCSC)	Chr 1: 1.39 – 1.4 Mb	Chr 4: 155.9 – 155.91 Mb
PubMed search
- Wikidata
View/Edit Human	View/Edit Mouse

Cyclin-L2 is a protein that in humans is encoded by the CCNL2 gene. The protein encoded by this gene belongs to cyclin family.

== CCNL2 gene also called ==
Cyclin L2	HLA-ISO
Paneth Cell-Enhanced Expression Protein	SB138
Cyclin S	CCNS
Cyclin M	PCEE
Cyclin-L2	CCNM
HCLA-ISO	
ANIA-6B	

Table Source: genecards.org
