= G2 phase =

Third subphase of interphase

Diagram of the G_{2} phase

The G_{2} phase, Gap 2 phase, or Growth 2 phase, is the third subphase of interphase in the cell cycle directly preceding mitosis. It follows the successful completion of S phase, during which the cell’s DNA is replicated. G_{2} phase ends with the onset of prophase, the first phase of mitosis in which the cell’s chromatin condenses into chromosomes.

G_{2} phase is a period of rapid cell growth and protein synthesis during which the cell prepares itself for mitosis. G_{2} phase is not a necessary part of the cell cycle, as some cell types (particularly young Xenopus embryos and some cancers) proceed directly from DNA replication to mitosis. Though much is known about the genetic network which regulates G2 phase and subsequent entry into mitosis, there is still much to be discovered concerning its significance and regulation, particularly in regards to cancer. One hypothesis is that the growth in G_{2} phase is regulated as a method of cell size control. Fission yeast (Schizosaccharomyces pombe) has been previously shown to employ such a mechanism, via Cdr2-mediated spatial regulation of Wee1 activity. Though Wee1 is a fairly conserved negative regulator of mitotic entry, no general mechanism of cell size control in G2 has yet been elucidated.

Biochemically, the end of G_{2} phase occurs when a threshold level of active cyclin B1/CDK1 complex, also known as Maturation promoting factor (MPF) has been reached. The activity of this complex is tightly regulated during G_{2}. In particular, the G_{2} checkpoint arrests cells in G_{2} in response to DNA damage through inhibitory regulation of CDK1.

== Homologous recombinational repair ==
During mitotic S phase, DNA replication produces two nearly identical sister chromatids. DNA double-strand breaks that arise after replication has progressed or during the G2 phase can be repaired before cell division occurs (M-phase of the cell cycle). Thus, during the G2 phase, double-strand breaks in one sister chromatid may be repaired by homologous recombinational repair using the other intact sister chromatid as template.

== End of G_{2}/entry into mitosis ==
Mitotic entry is determined by a threshold level of active cyclin-B1/CDK1 complex, also known as cyclin-B1/Cdc2 or the maturation promoting factor (MPF). Active cyclin-B1/CDK1 triggers irreversible actions in early mitosis, including centrosome separation, nuclear envelope breakdown, and spindle assembly. In vertebrates, there are five cyclin B isoforms (B1, B2, B3, B4, and B5), but the specific role of each of these isoforms in regulating mitotic entry is still unclear. It is known that cyclin B1 can compensate for loss of both cyclin B2 (and vice versa in Drosophila). Saccharomyces cerevisiae contains six B-type cyclins (Clb1-6), with Clb2 being the most essential for function. In both vertebrates and S. cerevisiae, it is speculated that the presence of multiple B-type cyclins allows different cyclins to regulate different portions of the G2/M transition while also making the transition robust to perturbations.

Subsequent discussions will focus on the spatial and temporal activation of cyclin B1/CDK in mammalian cells, but similar pathways are applicable in both other metazoans and in S. cerevisiae.

=== Cyclin B1 synthesis and degradation ===
Cyclin B1 levels are suppressed throughout G1 and S phases by the anaphase-promoting complex (APC), an E3 ubiquitin ligase which targets cyclin B1 for proteolysis. Transcription begins at the end of S phase after DNA replication, in response to phosphorylation of transcription factors such as NF-Y, FoxM1 and B-Myb by upstream G1 and G1/S cyclin-CDK complexes.

=== Regulation of cyclin-B1/CDK1 activity ===
Increased levels of cyclin B1 cause rising levels of cyclin B1-CDK1 complexes throughout G2, but the complex remains inactive prior to the G2/M transition due to inhibitory phosphorylation by the Wee1 and Myt1 kinases. Wee1 is localized primarily to the nucleus and acts on the Tyr15 site, while Myt1 is localized to the outer surface of the ER and acts predominantly on the Thr14 site.

The effects of Wee1 and Myt1 are counteracted by phosphatases in the cdc25 family, which remove the inhibitory phosphates on CDK1 and thus convert the cyclin B1-CDK1 complex to its fully activated form, MPF.

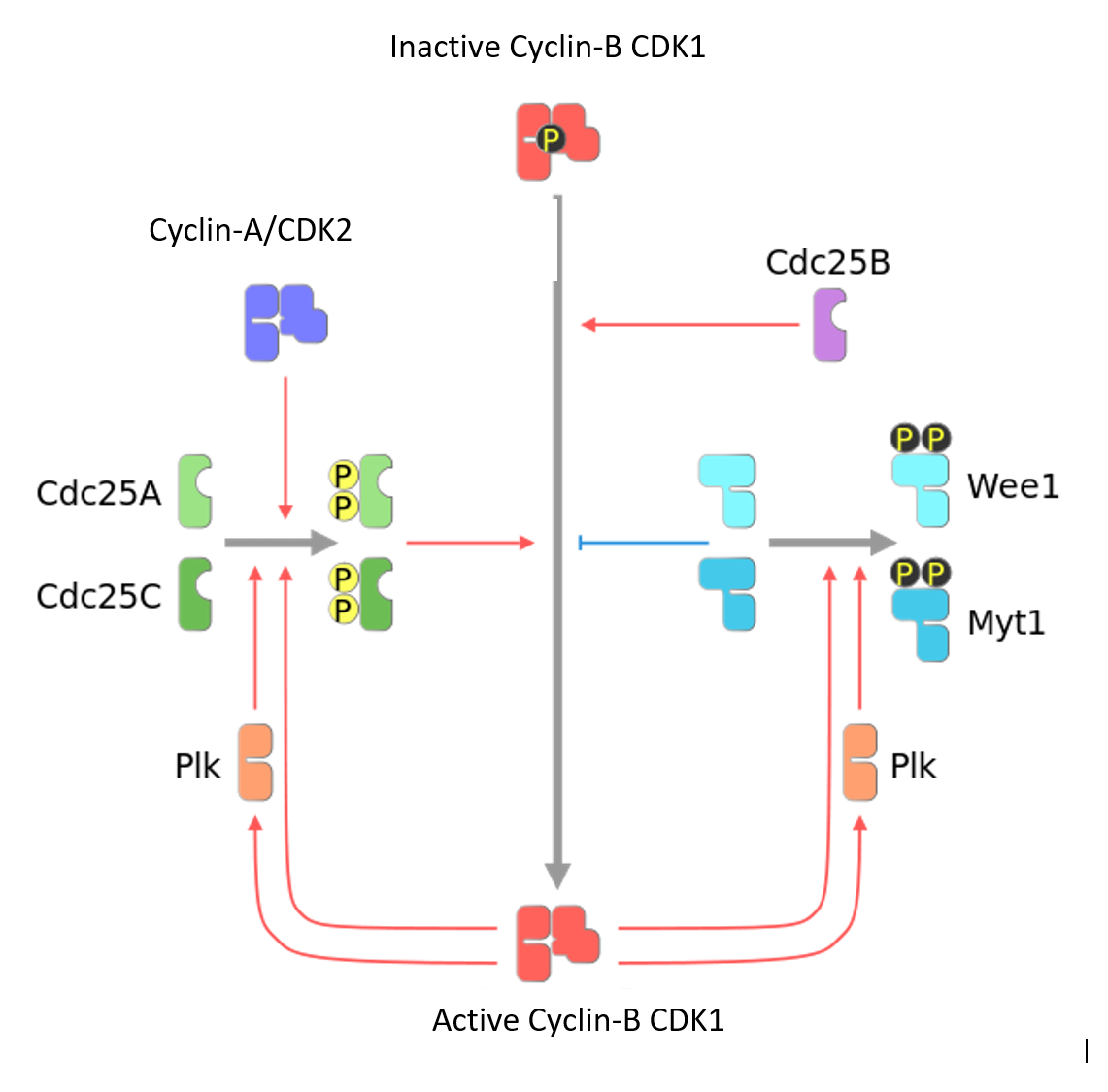
This diagram illustrates the feedback loops underlying the G2/M transition. Cyclin-B1/CDK1 activates Plk and inactivates Wee1 and Myt1. Activated Plk activates cdc25. Activation of Cdc25 and inactivation of Wee1/Myt1 lead to further activation of Cyclin-B1/CDK1. Also shown is the putative role of cyclin-A/CDK2 and Cdc25A as initial activators of the feedback loop, discussed in a later section.

Active cyclinB1-CDK1 phosphorylates and modulates the activity of Wee1 and the Cdc25 isoforms A and C. Specifically, CDK1 phosphorylation inhibits Wee1 kinase activity, activates Cdc25C phosphatase activity via activating the intermediate kinase PLK1, and stabilizes Cdc25A. Thus, CDK1 forms a positive feedback loop with Cdc25 and a double negative feedback loop with Wee1 (essentially a net positive feedback loop).

=== Positive feedback and switch-like activation ===
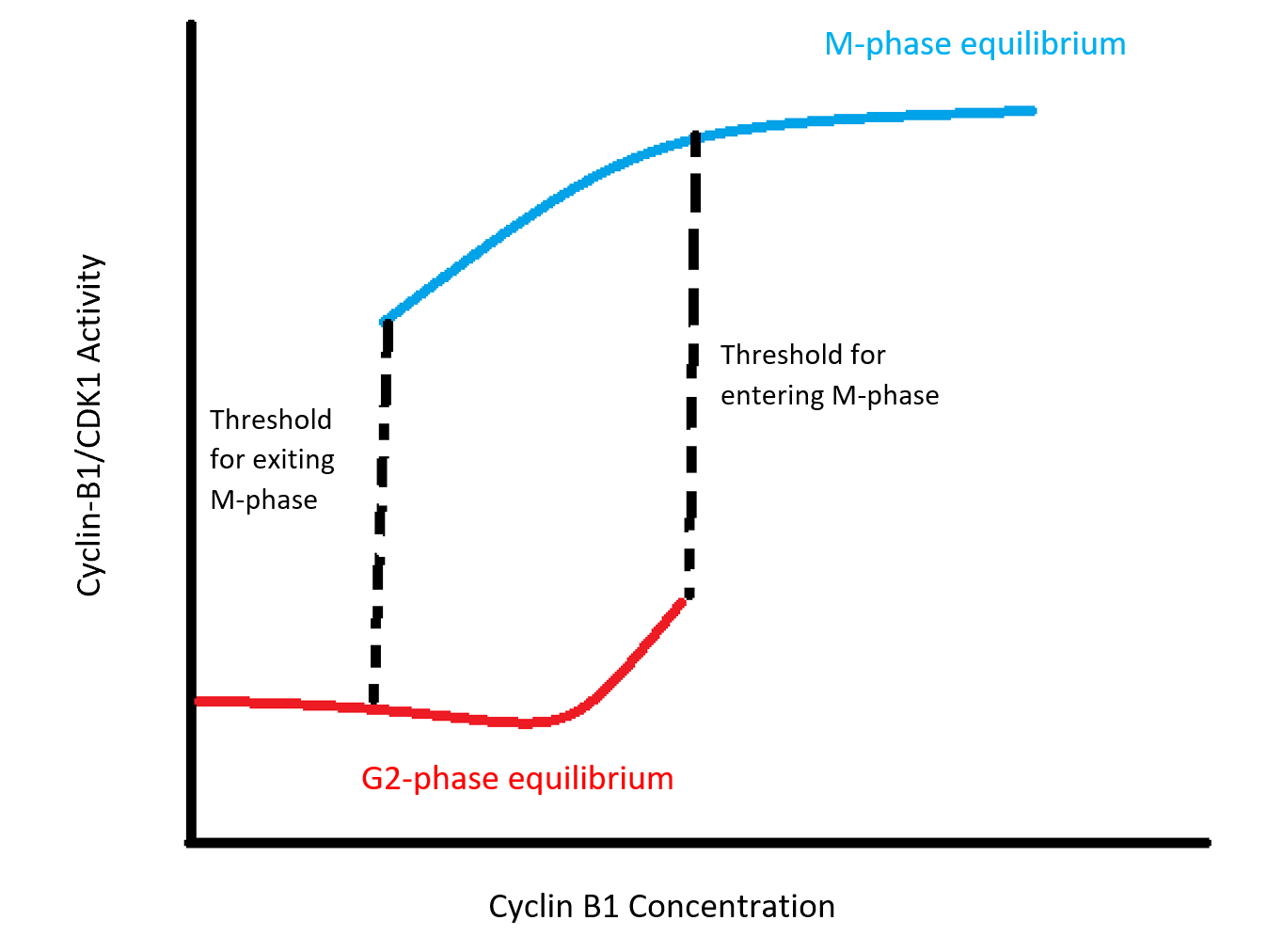
This graph illustrates the stable equilibria for cyclin-B1/CDK1 activity at varying cyclin B1 concentrations, with the threshold of cyclin B concentration for entering mitosis higher than the threshold for exiting mitosis.

These positive feedback loops encode a hysteretic bistable switch in CDK1 activity relative to cyclin B1 levels (see figure). This switch is characterized by two distinct stable equilibria over a bistable region of cyclin B1 concentrations. One equilibrium corresponds to interphase and is characterized by inactivity of Cyclin-B1/CDK1 and Cdc25, and a high level of Wee1 and Myt1 activity. The other equilibrium corresponds to M-phase and is characterized by high activity of Cyclin-B1/CDK1 and Cdc25, and low Wee1 and Myt1 activity. Within the range of bistability, a cell’s state depends upon whether it was previously in interphase or M-phase: the threshold concentration for entering M-phase is higher than the minimum concentration that will sustain M-phase activity once a cell has already exited interphase.

Scientists have both theoretically and empirically validated the bistable nature of the G2/M transition. The Novak-Tyson model shows that the differential equations modelling the cyclin-B/CDK1-cdc25-Wee1-Myt1 feedback loop admit two stable equilibria over a range of cyclin-B concentrations. Experimentally, bistability has been validated by blocking endogenous cyclin B1 synthesis and titrating interphase and M-phase cells with varying concentrations of non-degradable cyclin B1. These experiments show that the threshold concentration for entering M-phase is higher than the threshold for exiting M-phase: nuclear envelope break-down occurs between 32-40 nm cyclin-B1 for cells exiting interphase, while the nucleus remains disintegrated at concentrations above 16-24 nm in cells already in M-phase.

This bistable, hysteretic switch is physiologically necessary for at least three reasons. First, the G2/M transition signals the initiation of several events, such as chromosome condensation and nuclear envelope breakdown, that markedly change the morphology of the cell and are only viable in dividing cells. It is therefore essential that cyclin-B1/CDK1 activation occurs in a switch-like manner; that is, cells should rapidly settle into a discrete M-phase state after the transition, and should not persist in a continuum of intermediate states (e.g., with a partially decomposed nuclear envelope). This requirement is satisfied by the sharp discontinuity separating the interphase and M-phase equilibrium levels of CDK1 activity; as the cyclin-B concentration increases beyond the activation threshold, the cell rapidly switches to the M-phase equilibrium.

Secondly, it is also vital that the G2/M transition occur unidirectionally, or only once per cell cycle Biological systems are inherently noisy, and small fluctuations in cyclin B1 concentrations near the threshold for the G2/M transition should not cause the cell to switch back and forth between interphase and M-phase states. This is ensured by the bistable nature of the switch: after the cell transitions to the M-phase state, small decreases in the concentration of cyclin B do not cause the cell to switch back to interphase.

Finally, the continuation of the cell cycle requires persisting oscillations in cyclin-B/CDK1 activity as the cell and its descendants transition in and out of M-phase. Negative feedback provides one essential element of this long-term oscillation: cyclin-B/CDK activates APC/C, which causes degradation of cyclin-B from metaphase onwards, restoring CDK1 to its inactive state. However, simple negative feedback loops lead to damped oscillations that eventually settle on a steady state. Kinetic models show that negative feedback loops coupled with bistable positive feedback motifs can lead to persistent, non-damped oscillations (see relaxation oscillator) of the kind required for long-term cell cycling.

=== Positive feedback ===
The positive feedback loop mentioned above, in which cyclin-B1/CDK1 promotes its own activation by inhibiting Wee1 and Myst1 and activating cdc25, does not inherently include a “trigger” mechanism to initiate the feedback loop. Recently, evidence has emerged suggesting a more important role for cyclin A2/CDK complexes in regulating the initiation of this switch. Cyclin A2/CDK2 activity begins in early S phase and increases during G_{2}. Cdc25B has been shown to dephosphorylate Tyr15 on CDK2 in early-to-mid G_{2} in a manner similar to the aforementioned CDK1 mechanism. Downregulation of cyclin A2 in U2OS cells delays cyclin-B1/CDK1 activation by increasing Wee1 activity and lowering Plk1 and Cdc25C activity. However, cyclin A2/CDK complexes do not function strictly as activators of cyclin B1/CDK1 in G_{2}, as CDK2 has been shown to be required for activation of the p53-independent G_{2} checkpoint activity, perhaps through a stabilizing phosphorylation on Cdc6. CDK2-/- cells also have aberrantly high levels of Cdc25A. Cyclin A2/CDK1 has also been shown to mediate proteasomal destruction of Cdc25B. These pathways are often deregulated in cancer.

=== Spatial regulation ===
In addition to the bistable and hysteretic aspects of cyclin B1-CDK1 activation, regulation of subcellular protein localization also contributes to the G2/M transition. Inactive cyclin B1-CDK1 accumulates in the cytoplasm, begins to be activated by cytoplasmic cdc25, and then is rapidly sequestered into the nucleus during prophase (as it is further activated). In mammals, cyclin B1/CDK1 translocation to the nucleus is activated by phosphorylation of five serine sites on cyclin B1's cytoplasmic retention site (CRS): S116, S26, S128, S133, and S147. In Xenopus laevis, cyclin B1 contains four analogous CRS serine phosphorylation sites (S94, S96, S101, and S113) indicating that this mechanism is highly conserved. Nuclear export is also inactivated by phosphorylation of cyclin B1's nuclear export signal (NES). The regulators of these phosphorylation sites are still largely unknown but several factors have been identified, including extracellular signal-regulated kinases (ERKs), PLK1, and CDK1 itself. Upon reaching some threshold level of phosphorylation, translocation of cyclin B1/CDK1 to the nucleus is extremely rapid. Once in the nucleus, cyclin B1/CDK1 phosphorylates many targets in preparation for mitosis, including histone H1, nuclear lamins, centrosomal proteins, and microtubule associated proteins (MAPs).

The subcellular localization of cdc25 also shifts from the cytosol to the nucleus during prophase. This is accomplished via removal of nuclear localization sequence (NLS)-obscuring phosphates and phosphorylation of the nuclear export signal. It is thought that the simultaneous transport of cdc25 and cyclin-B1/CDK1 into the nucleus amplify the switch-like nature of the transition by increasing the effective concentrations of the proteins.

== G2/M DNA damage arrest ==
Cells respond to DNA damage or incompletely replicated chromosomes in G2 phase by delaying the G2/M transition so as to prevent attempts to segregate damaged chromosomes. DNA damage is detected by the kinases ATM and ATR, which activate Chk1, an inhibitory kinase of Cdc25. Chk1 inhibits Cdc25 activity both directly and by promoting its exclusion from the nucleus. The net effect is an increase in the threshold of cyclin B1 required to initiate the hysteretic transition to M-phase, effectively stalling the cell in G2 until the damage is repaired by mechanisms such as homology-directed repair (see above).

Long-term maintenance of the G2 arrest is also mediated by p53, which is stabilized in response to DNA damage. CDK1 is directly inhibited by three transcriptional targets of p53: p21, Gadd45, and 14-3-3σ. Inactive Cyclin B1/CDK1 is sequestered in the nucleus by p21, while active Cyclin B1/CDK1 complexes are sequestered in the cytoplasm by 14-3-3σ. Gadd45 disrupts the binding of Cyclin B1 and CDK1 through direct interaction with CDK1. P53 also directly transcriptionally represses CDK1.

== Medical relevance ==
Mutations in several genes involved in the G2/M transition are implicated in many cancers. Overexpression of both cyclin B and CDK1, oftentimes downstream of loss of tumor suppressors such as p53, can cause an increase in cell proliferation. Experimental approaches to mitigate these changes include both pharmacological inhibition of CDK1 and downregulation of cyclin B1 expression (e.g., via siRNA).

Other attempts to modulate the G2/M transition for chemotherapy applications have focused on the DNA damage checkpoint. Pharmacologically bypassing the G2/M checkpoint via inhibition of Chk1 has been shown to enhance cytotoxicity of other chemotherapy drugs. Bypassing the checkpoint leads to the rapid accumulation of deleterious mutations, which is thought to drive the cancerous cells into apoptosis. Conversely, attempts to prolong the G2/M arrest have also been shown to enhance the cytotoxicity of drugs like doxorubicin. These approaches remain in clinical and pre-clinical phases of research.
