= CCNI (gene) =

Protein-coding gene in humans

Identifiers
- Aliases: CCNI, CCNI1, CYC1, CYI, cyclin I
- External IDs: MGI: 1341077; GeneCards: CCNI

Gene location (Mouse)
Chr.	Chromosome 5 (mouse)
Band	5|5 E2	Start	93,329,792 bp
Band	5|5 E2	End	93,354,354 bp
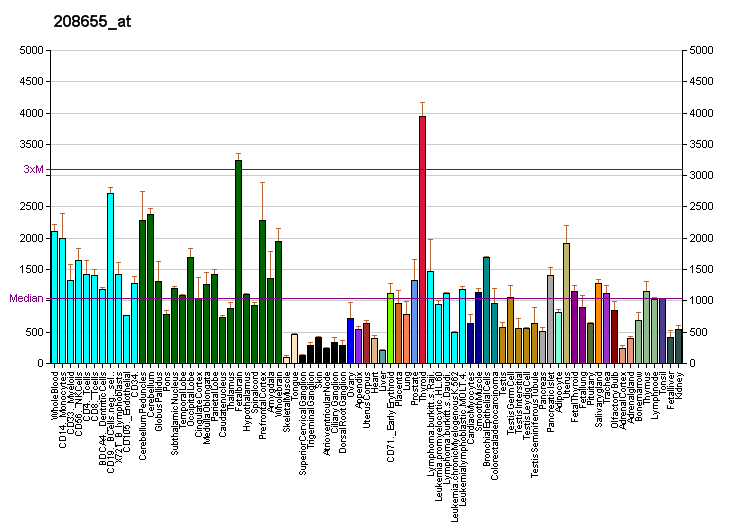

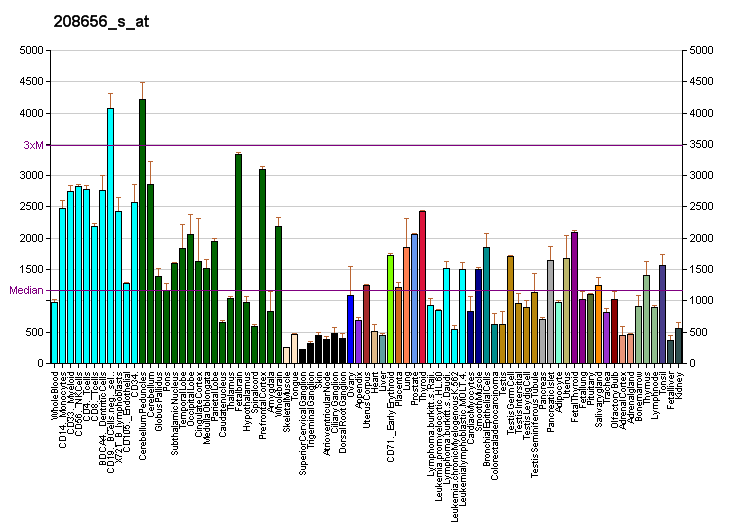
RNA expression pattern
Bgee	Human / Mouse (ortholog); n/a / Top expressed in: ganglionic eminence; tail of embryo; dentate gyrus of hippocampal formation granule cell; ventricular zone; spermatocyte; cerebellar cortex; primary visual cortex; superior frontal gyrus; ovary; hippocampus proper
BioGPS	More reference expression data
Gene ontology
Molecular function	protein kinase activity; cyclin-dependent protein serine/threonine kinase regulator activity; protein kinase binding
Cellular component	cyclin-dependent protein kinase holoenzyme complex; nucleus; cytoplasm
Biological process	spermatogenesis; regulation of cell cycle; regulation of cyclin-dependent protein serine/threonine kinase activity; mitotic cell cycle; protein phosphorylation; regulation of mitotic nuclear division; positive regulation of cell population proliferation; positive regulation of cell cycle; mitotic cell cycle phase transition
Sources:Amigo / QuickGO
Orthologs
Databases	NCBI: entry; OMA: entry
Species	Human	Mouse
Entrez	10983	12453
Ensembl	ENSG00000118816	ENSMUSG00000063015
UniProt	Q14094	Q9Z2V9
RefSeq (mRNA)	NM_006835	NM_017367
RefSeq (protein)	NP_006826; NP_001335061; NP_001335062; NP_001335063; NP_001335064 NP_001335065; NP_001335066; NP_001335067; NP_001335068; NP_001335069	NP_059063
Location (UCSC)	n/a	Chr 5: 93.33 – 93.35 Mb
PubMed search
- Wikidata
View/Edit Human	View/Edit Mouse

Cyclin-I is a protein that in humans is encoded by the CCNI gene.

The protein encoded by this gene belongs to the highly conserved cyclin family, whose members are characterized by a dramatic periodicity in protein abundance through the cell cycle. Cyclins function as regulators of CDK kinases. Different cyclins exhibit distinct expression and degradation patterns which contribute to the temporal coordination of each mitotic event. This cyclin shows the highest similarity with cyclin G. The transcript of this gene was found to be expressed constantly during cell cycle progression. The function of this cyclin has not yet been determined.
