= Cyclin-Y =

Protein-coding gene in humans

CCNY

Identifiers
- Aliases: CCNY, C10orf9, CBCP1, CCNX, CFP1, cyclin Y
- External IDs: OMIM: 612786; MGI: 1915224; GeneCards: CCNY

Gene location (Human)
Chr.	Chromosome 10 (human)
Band	10p11.21	Start	35,247,025 bp
Band	10p11.21	End	35,572,669 bp

Gene location (Mouse)
Chr.	Chromosome 18 (mouse)
Band	18|18 A1	Start	9,312,304 bp
Band	18|18 A1	End	9,450,154 bp
RNA expression pattern
Bgee	Human / Mouse (ortholog); Top expressed in: sperm; left testis; right testis; cardiac muscle tissue of right atrium; myocardium of left ventricle; monocyte; ventricular zone; skin of arm; prefrontal cortex; stromal cell of endometrium / Top expressed in: aortic valve; ascending aorta; hand; foot; otolith organ; atrioventricular valve; utricle; atrium; molar; cumulus cell; More reference expression data
BioGPS	n/a
Gene ontology
Molecular function	cyclin-dependent protein serine/threonine kinase regulator activity; protein binding; protein kinase binding
Cellular component	cytoplasmic cyclin-dependent protein kinase holoenzyme complex; plasma membrane; membrane; nucleus
Biological process	regulation of canonical Wnt signaling pathway; cell cycle; regulation of cyclin-dependent protein serine/threonine kinase activity; G2/M transition of mitotic cell cycle; Wnt signaling pathway; positive regulation of cyclin-dependent protein serine/threonine kinase activity; cell division
Sources:Amigo / QuickGO
Orthologs
Databases	NCBI: entry; OMA: entry
Species	Human	Mouse
Entrez	219771	67974
Ensembl	ENSG00000108100	ENSMUSG00000024286
UniProt	Q8ND76	Q8BGU5
RefSeq (mRNA)	NM_001282852; NM_001282853; NM_001282854; NM_145012; NM_181698	NM_026484
RefSeq (protein)	NP_001269781; NP_001269782; NP_001269783; NP_659449; NP_859049	NP_080760
Location (UCSC)	Chr 10: 35.25 – 35.57 Mb	Chr 18: 9.31 – 9.45 Mb
PubMed search
- Wikidata
View/Edit Human	View/Edit Mouse

Cyclin-Y is a protein that in humans is encoded by the CCNY gene.
