= Cyclin B2 =

Protein-coding gene in the species Homo sapiens

CCNB2

Identifiers
- Aliases: CCNB2, HsT17299, Cyclin B2
- External IDs: OMIM: 602755; MGI: 88311; GeneCards: CCNB2

Gene location (Human)
Chr.	Chromosome 15 (human)
Band	15q22.2	Start	59,105,126 bp
Band	15q22.2	End	59,125,045 bp

Gene location (Mouse)
Chr.	Chromosome 9 (mouse)
Band	9|9 D	Start	70,314,974 bp
Band	9|9 D	End	70,328,829 bp
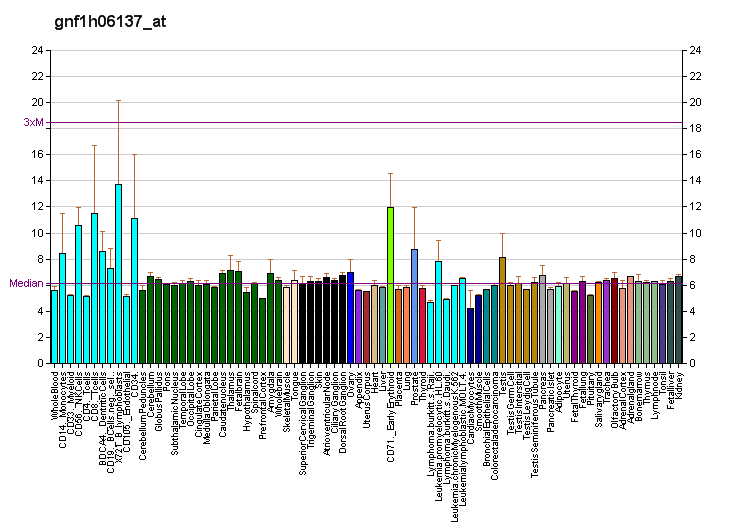

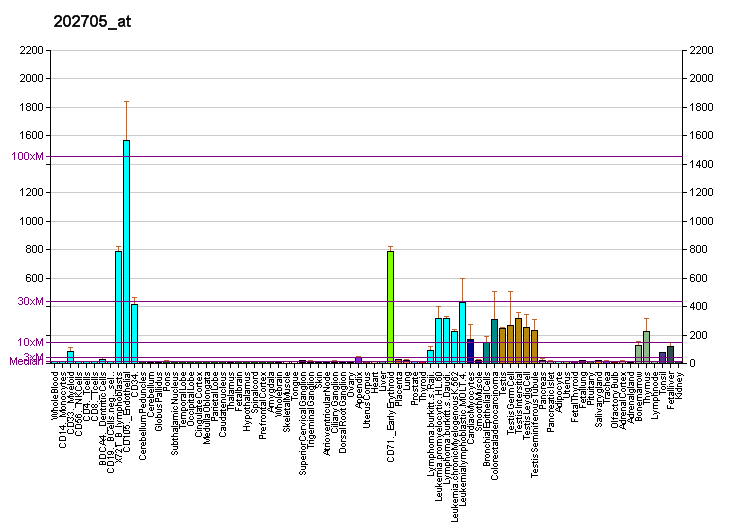

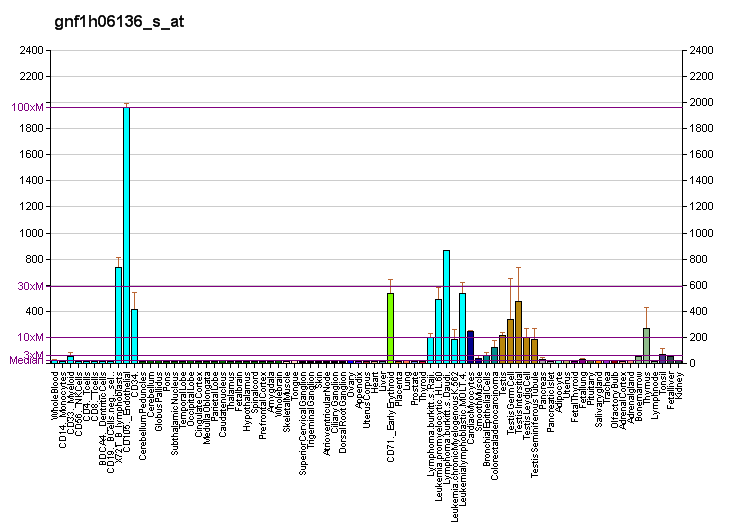
RNA expression pattern
Bgee	Human / Mouse (ortholog); Top expressed in: oocyte; ventricular zone; secondary oocyte; gonad; embryo; ganglionic eminence; sperm; trabecular bone; left testis; right testis / Top expressed in: fetal liver hematopoietic progenitor cell; Ileal epithelium; genital tubercle; dermis; seminiferous tubule; ventricular zone; medial ganglionic eminence; tibiofemoral joint; tail of embryo; abdominal wall; More reference expression data
BioGPS	More reference expression data
Gene ontology
Molecular function	protein binding; cyclin-dependent protein serine/threonine kinase activity; cadherin binding; protein kinase activity; cyclin-dependent protein serine/threonine kinase regulator activity; protein kinase binding
Cellular component	microtubule cytoskeleton; centrosome; membrane; nucleus; cytosol; cyclin-dependent protein kinase holoenzyme complex; cytoplasm
Biological process	T cell homeostasis; thymus development; cell division; cell cycle; mitotic nuclear membrane disassembly; in utero embryonic development; G2/M transition of mitotic cell cycle; regulation of cell cycle; growth; regulation of cyclin-dependent protein serine/threonine kinase activity; mitotic cell cycle; protein phosphorylation; regulation of mitotic nuclear division; positive regulation of cell population proliferation; regulation of growth; positive regulation of cell cycle; mitotic cell cycle phase transition
Sources:Amigo / QuickGO
Orthologs
Databases	NCBI: entry; OMA: entry
Species	Human	Mouse
Entrez	9133	12442
Ensembl	ENSG00000157456	ENSMUSG00000032218
UniProt	O95067	P30276
RefSeq (mRNA)	NM_004701	NM_007630
RefSeq (protein)	NP_004692	NP_031656
Location (UCSC)	Chr 15: 59.11 – 59.13 Mb	Chr 9: 70.31 – 70.33 Mb
PubMed search
- Wikidata
View/Edit Human	View/Edit Mouse

G2/mitotic-specific cyclin-B2 is a protein that in humans is encoded by the CCNB2 gene.

== Function ==
Cyclin B2 is a member of the cyclin family, specifically the B-type cyclins. The B-type cyclins, B1 and B2, associate with p34cdc2 and are essential components of the cell cycle regulatory machinery. B1 and B2 differ in their subcellular localization. Cyclin B1 co-localizes with microtubules, whereas cyclin B2 is primarily associated with the Golgi region. Cyclin B2 also binds to transforming growth factor beta RII and thus cyclin B2/cdc2 may play a key role in transforming growth factor beta-mediated cell cycle control.

== Interactions ==
Cyclin B2 has been shown to interact with TGF beta receptor 2.

== See also ==
- Cyclin B
