= Maturation promoting factor =

Biological factor

Maturation-promoting factor (abbreviated MPF, also called mitosis-promoting factor or M-Phase-promoting factor) is the cyclin–Cdk complex that was discovered first in frog eggs. It stimulates the mitotic and meiotic phases of the cell cycle. MPF promotes the entrance into mitosis (the M phase) from the G_{2} phase by phosphorylating multiple proteins needed during mitosis. MPF is activated at the end of G_{2} by a phosphatase, which removes an inhibitory phosphate group added earlier.

The MPF is also called the M phase kinase because of its ability to phosphorylate target proteins at a specific point in the cell cycle and thus control their ability to function.

== Discovery ==
In 1971, two independent teams of researchers (Yoshio Masui and Clement Markert, as well as L. Dennis Smith and Robert Ecker) found that frog oocytes arrested in G_{2} could be induced to enter M phase by microinjection of cytoplasm from oocytes that had been hormonally stimulated with progesterone. Because the entry of oocytes into meiosis is frequently referred to as oocyte maturation, this cytoplasmic factor was called maturation promoting factor (MPF). Further studies showed, however, that the activity of MPF is not restricted to the entry of oocytes into meiosis. To the contrary, MPF is also present in somatic cells, where it induces entry into M phase of the mitotic cycle.

Evidence that a diffusible factor regulates the entry into mitosis had been previously obtained in 1966 using the slime mold Physarum polycephalum in which the nuclei of the multi-nucleate plasmodial form undergo synchronous mitoses. Fusing plasmodia whose cell cycles were out of phase with each other led to a synchronous mitosis in the next mitotic cycle. This result demonstrated that mitotic entry was controlled by a diffusible cytoplasmic factor and not by a "nuclear clock."

== Structure ==
MPF is composed of two subunits:

- Cyclin-dependent kinase 1 (CDK1), the cyclin-dependent kinase subunit. It uses ATP to phosphorylate specific serine and threonine residues of target proteins.
- Cyclin, a regulatory subunit. The cyclins are necessary for the kinase subunit to function with the appropriate substrate. The mitotic cyclins can be grouped as cyclins A & B. These cyclins have a nine residue sequence in the N-terminal region called the “destruction box”, which can be recognized by the ubiquitin ligase enzyme which destroys the cyclins when appropriate.

== Role in the cell cycle ==
During G_{1} and S phase, the CDK1 subunit of MPF is inactive due to an inhibitory enzyme, Wee1. Wee1 phosphorylates the Tyr-15 residue of CDK1, rendering MPF inactive. During the transition of G_{2} to M phase, cdk1 is de-phosphorylated by CDC25. The CDK1 subunit is now free and can bind to cyclin B, activate MPF, and make the cell enter mitosis. There is also a positive feedback loop that inactivates wee1.

=== Activation ===
MPF must be activated in order for the cell to transition from G_{2} to M phase. There are three amino acid residues responsible for this G_{2} to M phase transition. The Threonine-161 (Thr-161) on CDK1 must be phosphorylated by a CDK-activating kinase (CAK). CAK only phosphorylates Thr-161 when cyclin B is attached to CDK1.

In addition, two other residues on the CDK1 subunit must be activated by dephosphorylation. CDC25 removes a phosphate from residues Threonine-14 (Thr-14) and Tyrosine-15 (Tyr-15) and adds a hydroxyl group. Cyclin B/CDK1 activates CDC25 resulting in a positive feedback loop.

=== Overview of functions ===
- Triggers the formation of mitotic spindle through microtubule instability.
- Promotes mitosis i.e. chromatin condensation through phosphorylation of condensins.
- The three lamins present in the nuclear lamina, lamin A, B & C, are phosphorylated by MPF at serine amino residues. This leads to depolymerisation of the nuclear lamina & breakdown of nuclear envelope into small vesicles.
- Causes phosphorylation of GM130, which leads to the fragmentation of the Golgi and the ER.

=== Targets ===
The following are affected by MPF.

- condensins, which enable chromatin condensation (see prophase)
- various microtubule-associated proteins involved in mitotic spindle formation
- lamins, interaction contributing to degradation of the nuclear envelope
- Histones, H_{1} and H_{3}
- Golgi matrix, to cause fragmentation

=== Inhibition of myosin ===
MPF phosphorylates inhibitory sites on myosin early in mitosis. This prevents cytokinesis. When MPF activity falls at anaphase, the inhibitory sites are dephosphorylated and cytokinesis proceeds.

=== Disassembly by anaphase-promoting complex ===
MPF is disassembled when anaphase-promoting complex (APC) polyubiquitinates cyclin B, marking it for degradation in a negative feedback loop. In intact cells, cyclin degradation begins shortly after the onset of anaphase (late anaphase), the period of mitosis when sister chromatids are separated and pulled toward opposite spindle poles. As the concentration of Cyclin B/CDK1 increases, the heterodimer promotes APC to polyubiquitinate Cyclin B/CDK1.
