= PKMYT1 =

Protein-coding gene in the species Homo sapiens

Identifiers
- Aliases: PKMYT1, MYT1, PPP1R126, protein kinase, membrane associated tyrosine/threonine 1
- External IDs: OMIM: 602474; MGI: 2137630; GeneCards: PKMYT1
Available structures
PDB	Ortholog search: PDBe RCSB
PDB	List of PDB id codes 3P1A
Enzyme activity
EC #	BRENDA	ExPASy	KEGG	MetaCyc
2.7.11.1	↗	↗	↗	↗

Gene location (Human)
Chr.	Chromosome 16 (human)
Band	16p13.3	Start	2,968,024 bp
Band	16p13.3	End	2,980,479 bp

Gene location (Mouse)
Chr.	Chromosome 17 (mouse)
Band	17|17 A3.3	Start	23,945,310 bp
Band	17|17 A3.3	End	23,955,709 bp
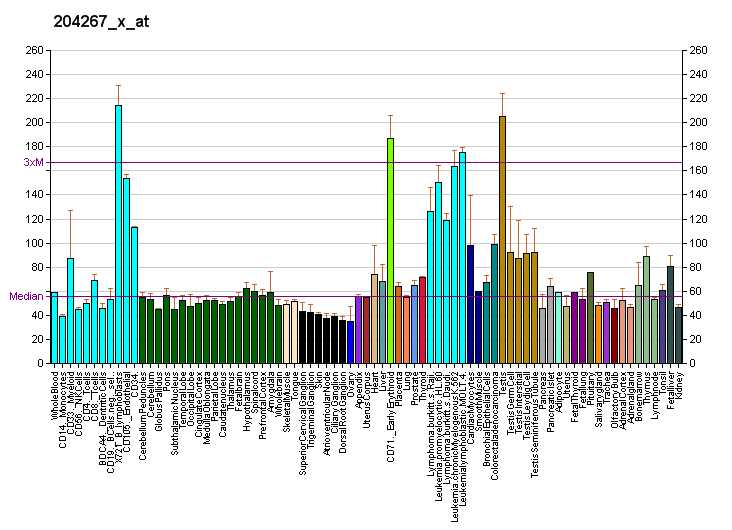
RNA expression pattern
Bgee	Human / Mouse (ortholog); Top expressed in: right testis; left testis; ventricular zone; ganglionic eminence; mucosa of transverse colon; gonad; oocyte; secondary oocyte; prefrontal cortex; right hemisphere of cerebellum / Top expressed in: spermatocyte; motor neuron; seminiferous tubule; zygote; secondary oocyte; fetal liver hematopoietic progenitor cell; primary oocyte; epithelium of small intestine; mucous cell of stomach; mesenteric lymph nodes; More reference expression data
BioGPS	More reference expression data
Gene ontology
Molecular function	transferase activity; protein kinase activity; nucleotide binding; metal ion binding; protein serine/threonine kinase activity; protein binding; ATP binding; kinase activity
Cellular component	cytoplasm; cytosol; endoplasmic reticulum membrane; membrane; Golgi membrane; nucleoplasm; endoplasmic reticulum; nucleus; nucleolus; Golgi apparatus
Biological process	regulation of cyclin-dependent protein serine/threonine kinase activity; phosphorylation; negative regulation of phosphatase activity; regulation of cell cycle; protein phosphorylation; G2/M transition of mitotic cell cycle; cell cycle; regulation of mitotic nuclear division; mitotic cell cycle; meiosis
Sources:Amigo / QuickGO
Orthologs
Databases	NCBI: entry; OMA: entry
Species	Human	Mouse
Entrez	9088	268930
Ensembl	ENSG00000127564	ENSMUSG00000023908
UniProt	Q99640; Q0IJ49	Q9ESG9
RefSeq (mRNA)	NM_001258450; NM_001258451; NM_004203; NM_182687	NM_023058
RefSeq (protein)	NP_001245379; NP_001245380; NP_004194; NP_872629; NP_004194.3	NP_075545
Location (UCSC)	Chr 16: 2.97 – 2.98 Mb	Chr 17: 23.95 – 23.96 Mb
PubMed search
- Wikidata
View/Edit Human	View/Edit Mouse

Membrane-associated tyrosine- and threonine-specific cdc2-inhibitory kinase also known as Myt1 kinase is an enzyme that in humans is encoded by the PKMYT1 gene.

Myt 1 is an enzyme in the Wee1 family and found in vertebrates. The Wee 1 family includes a variety of enzymes that all work to inhibit Cdk activity in a variety of different organisms. Myt 1 is important in regulating the cell cycle through inactivating Cdks through the phosphorylation of both Tyr 15 and Thr 14.

== Wee 1 family ==
There are other enzymes that play roles in the inactivation of Cdks in the Wee 1 family that work in a variety of different organisms. Some examples of Wee 1 family enzymes working in different species are as follows:

- S. cerevisiae: Swe 1
- S. pombe: Wee 1 and Mik 1
- D. melanogaster: Dwee 1 and Dmyt 1
- Vertebrates: WEE1 (phosphorylates only Tyr 15) and Myt 1 (phosphorylates both Tyr 15 and Thr 14)

Wee 1 is present in all eukaryotes under different names and is responsible for phosphorylating Tyr 15 in each of those organisms.

In fission yeast where Wee 1 is the primary inhibitor of Cdk1, mutations in the Wee 1 gene cause premature entry into mitosis. On the other hand, the overproduction of Wee 1 blocks entry into mitosis.

== Tyrosine phosphorylation ==
Myt 1 plays an important role in inhibiting Cdk activity through phosphorylating Tyr 15 and Thr 14. Tyr 15 is highly conserved and is found in all major Cdks, however has different names in different organisms. Animal cells have an additional Thr 14 site that aids in further Cdk inactivation.

Tyr 15 and Thr 14 are located on Cdks at their ATP binding site. It is thought that the phosphorylation of Tyr 15 and Thr 14 interferes with the orientation of ATP phosphates which inhibits Cdk functioning. The phosphorylation of these sites is particularly important during the beginning of mitosis as they are involved in the activation of M-Cdks. They are also believed to be involved in the timing of activation of S-phase Cdks and the entry into G1/S phase.

With Myt 1 inactivating Cdks by phosphorylating both Tyr 15 and Thr 14, there needs to be a method of dephosphorylating the sites so that the Cdk can become active once again. This dephosphorylation of inhibitory sites is done by the Cdc25 family. In vertebrates, the Cdc25 enzymes are Cdc25A which controls the checkpoints of G1/S and G2/M as well as Cdc25B and Cdc25C which both control the G2/M checkpoint.

== Mitosis ==
Myt 1 and Wee 1 kinases work together to inhibit Cdk 1 before mitosis. Myt 1 and Wee 1 concentrations are high throughout most of the cell cycle to ensure the inactivation of Cdk 1. During mitosis, concentrations of Myt 1 and Wee 1 decrease substantially which allows for the dephosphorylation activity of phosphatases in the Cdc 25 family and the subsequent activation of Cdk 1.

== Subcellular distribution ==
Myt 1 is located in the membranes of the Golgi apparatus and the Endoplasmic reticulum. Since almost all cyclin B1-Cdk 1 complexes are found in the cytoplasm, Myt 1 may be the most important inhibitory kinase for Cdk 1. Since Wee 1 is mostly located in the nucleus, it is believed that Wee 1 maintains the inhibition of the small amount of Cdk 1 that is found in the nucleus while Myt 1 does the rest of the inhibition. Various studies on the deletion of the Wee 1 gene in Drosophila show that an absent Wee 1 is not lethal. This suggests that the inhibition of Cdk 1 caused by Myt 1 is sufficient for mitosis. Further evidence that Myt 1 is the primary inhibitor of Cdk 1 is that Wee 1 is not found in Xenopus oocytes, leaving Myt 1 to be the sole inhibitor of Cdk 1.

== Regulation ==
The regulation of Myt 1, Wee 1, and Cdc25 lies in a positive feedback loop with Cdk 1. To regulate these three proteins, Cdk 1 hyperphosphorylates the N-terminal regulatory regions. This hyperphosphorylation activates Cdc25 and inhibits Myt 1 and Wee 1. The activation of Cdc25 causes an increase in its levels and the inhibition of Myt 1 and Wee 1 causes a decrease in their levels. This positive feedback led by Cdk 1 creates a bistable system where the cell has both a state of stable inactivity of Cdk 1 and a state of stable Cdk 1 activity. This regulatory system creates a switch where Cdk 1 can be turned on and off quickly and ensures that the process will still operate even if some part fails.

Protein kinases AKT1/PKB and PLK (Polo-like kinase) have also been shown to phosphorylate and regulate the activity of Myt 1. Alternatively spliced transcript variants encoding distinct isoforms have been reported.
