= 14-3-3 protein =

Family of conserved regulatory molecules

14-3-3
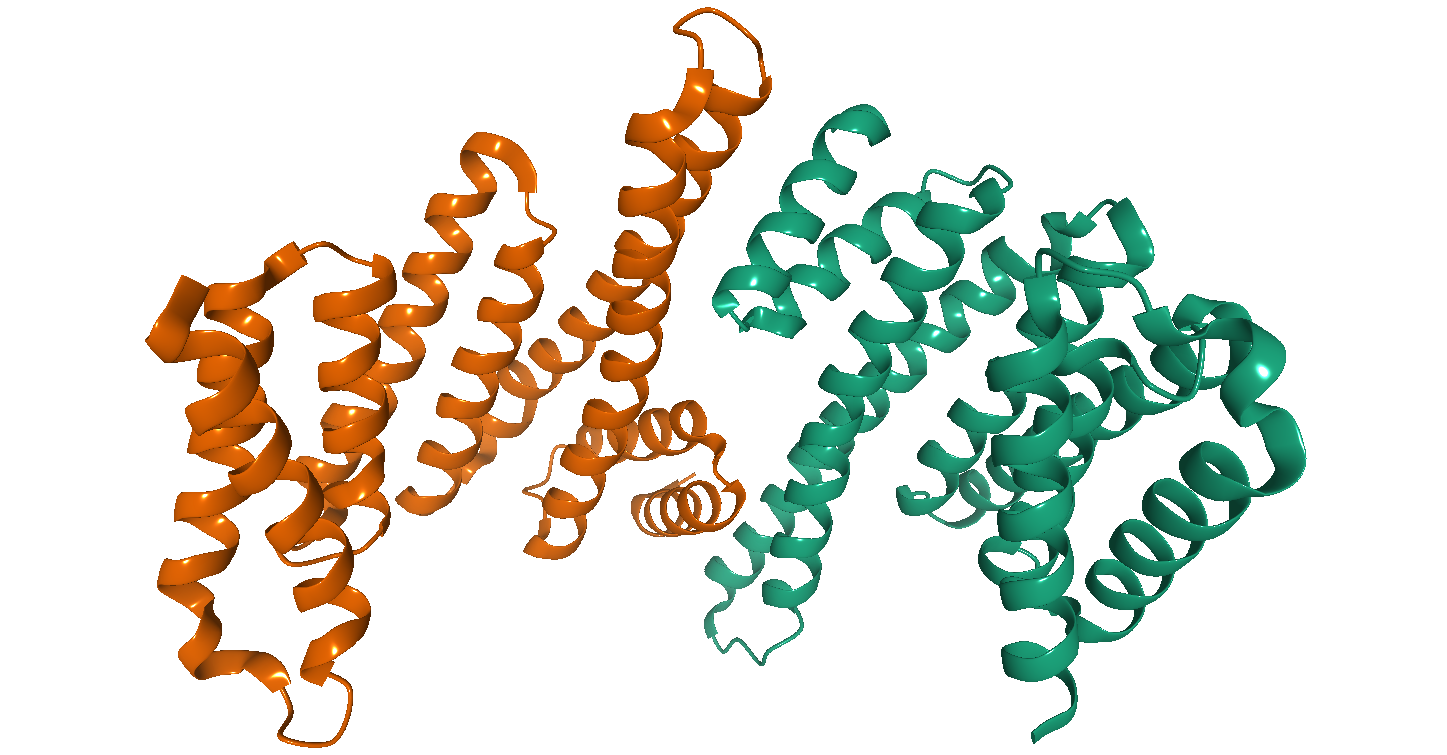
- Cartoon diagram of Human 14-3-3 protein beta PDB entry 2bq0

Identifiers
- Symbol: 14-3-3
- Pfam: PF00244
- InterPro: IPR000308
- SMART: 14_3_3
- PROSITE: PDOC00633
- SCOP2: 1a4o / SCOPe / SUPFAM
Available protein structures:
- PDB: IPR000308 PF00244 (ECOD; PDBsum)
- AlphaFold: IPR000308; PF00244

14-3-3 proteins are a family of conserved regulatory molecules that are expressed in all eukaryotic cells. 14-3-3 proteins have the ability to bind a multitude of functionally diverse signaling proteins, including kinases, phosphatases, and transmembrane receptors. More than 200 signaling proteins have been reported as 14-3-3 ligands.

Elevated amounts of 14-3-3 protein in cerebrospinal fluid are usually a sign of rapid neurodegeneration; a common indicator of Creutzfeldt–Jakob disease.

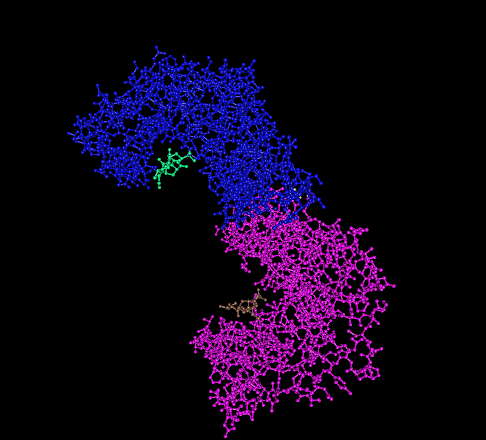
Molecular structure of a 14-3-3 protein dimer bound to a peptide.

== Properties ==
Seven genes encode seven distinct 14-3-3 proteins in most mammals (See Human genes below) and 13–15 genes in many higher plants, though typically in fungi they are present only in pairs. Protists have at least one. Eukaryotes can tolerate the loss of a single 14-3-3 gene if multiple genes are expressed, but deletion of all 14-3-3s (as experimentally determined in yeast) results in death.

14-3-3 proteins are structurally similar to the Tetratrico Peptide Repeat (TPR) superfamily, which generally have 9 or 10 alpha helices, and usually form homo- and/or hetero-dimer interactions along their amino-termini helices. These proteins contain a number of known common modification domains, including regions for divalent cation interaction, phosphorylation & acetylation, and proteolytic cleavage, among others established and predicted.

14-3-3 binds to peptides. There are common recognition motifs for 14-3-3 proteins that contain a phosphorylated serine or threonine residue, although binding to non-phosphorylated ligands has also been reported. This interaction occurs along a so-called binding groove or cleft that is amphipathic in nature. To date, the crystal structures of six classes of these proteins have been resolved and deposited in the public domain.

14-3-3 recognition motifs
Canonical	R[^DE]{0,2}[^DEPG]([ST])(([FWYLMV].)                         |([^PRIKGN]P)                         |([^PRIKGN].{2,4}[VILMFWYP]))
C-terminal	R[^DE]{0,2}[^DEPG]([ST])[^P]{0,1}$
Non-phos (ATP)	IR[^P] [^P]N[^P] [^P]WR[^P]W[YFH] [ITML] [^P]Y[IVL]
All entrys are in regular expression format. Newlines are added in "or" cases for readability. Phosphorylation sites are in bold. The motif sites are way more diverse than the patterns here suggest. For an example with a modern recognizer using an artificial neural network, see the cited article.

=== Discovery and naming ===
14-3-3 proteins were initially found in brain tissue in 1967 and purified using chromatography and gel electrophoresis. In bovine brain samples, 14-3-3 proteins were located in the 14th fraction eluting from a DEAE-cellulose column and in position 3.3 on a starch electrophoresis gel.

=== Function ===
14-3-3 proteins play an isoform-specific role in class switch recombination. They are believed to interact with the protein activation-induced cytidine deaminase in mediating class switch recombination.

Phosphorylation of Cdc25C by CDS1 and CHEK1 creates a binding site for the 14-3-3 family of phosphoserine binding proteins. Binding of 14-3-3 has little effect on Cdc25C activity, and it is believed that 14-3-3 regulates Cdc25C by sequestering it to the cytoplasm, thereby preventing the interactions with CycB-Cdk1 that are localized to the nucleus at the G2/M transition.

The eta isoform, YWHAH, is reported to be a biomarker (in synovial fluid) for rheumatoid arthritis. In a systematic review, 14-3-3η has been described as a welcome addition to the rheumatology field. The authors indicate that the serum based 14-3-3η marker is additive to the armamentarium of existing tools available to clinicians, and that there is adequate clinical evidence to support its clinical benefits in the management of patients diagnosed with rheumatoid arthritis (RA).

14-3-3 proteins bind to and sequester the transcriptional coregulators YAP/TAZ to the cytoplasm, inhibiting their function.

== 14-3-3 regulating cell-signalling ==
- Raf-1
- Bad – see Bcl-2
- Bax
- Cdc25
- Akt
- SOS1 – see RSK

== Human genes ==
- YWHAB – "14-3-3 beta"
- YWHAE – "14-3-3 epsilon"
- YWHAG – "14-3-3 gamma"
- YWHAH – "14-3-3 eta"
- YWHAQ – "14-3-3 theta"
- YWHAZ – "14-3-3 zeta"
- SFN or YWHAS – "14-3-3 sigma" (Stratifin)

The 14-3-3 proteins alpha and delta (YWHAA and YWHAD) are phosphorylated forms of YWHAB and YWHAZ, respectively.

== In plants ==
The presence of large gene families of 14-3-3 proteins in the Viridiplantae kingdom reflects their essential role in plant physiology. A phylogenetic analysis of 27 plant species clustered the 14-3-3 proteins into four groups.

14-3-3 proteins activate the auto-inhibited plasma membrane P-type H^{+} ATPases. They bind the ATPases' C-terminus at a conserved threonine.
