= Mitotic trigger waves =

Cellular process

Mitotic trigger waves are waves of Cyclin-dependent kinase 1 (Cdk1) activity in cells that originate from pacemaker regions of the nucleus and propagate through the cytoplasm. Because trigger waves do not decrease in speed or amplitude during their propagation, they are more reliable at conveying molecular information across greater distances compared to simple diffusion. Therefore, trigger waves ensure that different spatial components of cells can proceed through processes of mitosis in a rapid, timely manner. This wave model is considered particularly relevant to the development of large eggs such as that of the African clawed frog (Xenopus laevis), where simple diffusion cannot carry information quickly enough to synchronize the entire cell during mitosis.

== Biochemical basis ==
Using X. laevis egg extract as a model, it has been discovered that a cell’s entry into mitosis is regulated by the activation of the cyclin B/Cdk1 complex. The relationship between cyclin B/Cdk1 activation and cyclin concentration exhibits hysteresis, as a result of interactions between the cyclin B/Cdk1-Cdc25 positive feedback loop, the cyclin B/Cdk1-Wee1 inhibition positive feedback loop and the Cdk1-Fizzy negative feedback loop. The bistability of the cyclin B/Cdk1 regulation system potentially gives rise to trigger wave propagation. The waves are coordinated by pacemaker regions whose molecular waves oscillate more rapidly than the rest of the cell. The pacemakers are hypothesized to be located at the nuclei or centrosomes, with current evidence suggesting that the nuclei are more likely to be the origin of mitotic trigger waves

== Mathematical model ==
The speed of mitotic trigger waves can be estimated by Luther’s equation, v ≈ 2(D/τ)^{1/2}, where D is the diffusion coefficient and τ is related to the time for the bistable system to reach either its on- or off- switch threshold. Using this model to predict the propagation of trigger waves, the signal takes 2–5 minutes to travel from the pronuclei to the animal pole.

Mitotic trigger waves are most rapidly propagated at a 1x cytoplasmic concentration, but can be generated and propagated across a wide range of cellular environments. The propagation speed of the waves are robust when encountering fluctuations of the cellular environment, because an increase in reactant concentration is countered by a decrease in viscosity.

== Role in cell cycle progression ==
Trigger waves are an alternative to the random walk diffusion model of intracellular information transfer, and is significantly more efficient at a millimeter-to-meter distance range. Before the role of trigger waves in coordinating mitosis is discovered, the paradigm has been identified in neuronal action potential and cyclic AMP waves. In mitosis, trigger waves are essential to embryonic development for organisms including X.laevis and fruit flies (D. melanogaster).

With the previously accepted model of random walk diffusion, Cdk1 activation would coordinate synchronous entry into mitosis for somatic cells with a ~10μm diameter, but the process would take exponentially longer for embryonic cells with a diameter of ~600μm, making the model highly impractical. With the mitotic trigger wave model, the propagation of the mitotic signal reaches distant parts of the cell within minutes, which is a more accurate representation of actual mitotic signal propagation rates.

== Role in embryonic development ==
Mitotic trigger waves can potentially explain the mitotic coordination during early embryonic development. Early-stage embryos of metazoans undergo rounds of near-synchronous cell division, and the mechanism with which cells across a ~1mm embryo can maintain synchronized division is still unclear. While the mitotic coordination in wild type Drosophila exhibits a "sweep" wave, an alternative reaction-diffusion model with a dependency on the S-phase Cdk1 activation rate, the mitotic signal wave reverts back to a classic trigger wave when Cyclin A and Cyclin B are mutated in the flies to slow the entry into mitosis.
