= PIN1 =

Protein-coding gene in the species Homo sapiens

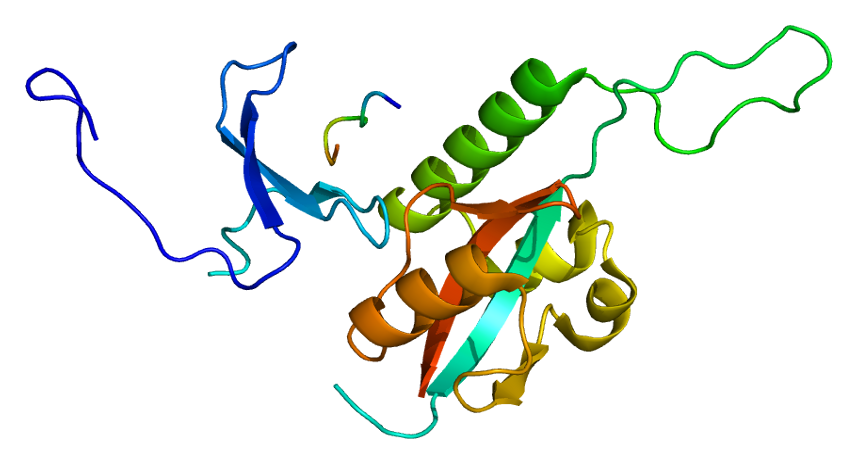

Identifiers
- Aliases: PIN1, DOD, UBL5, peptidylprolyl cis/trans isomerase, NIMA-interacting 1
- External IDs: OMIM: 601052; MGI: 1346036; GeneCards: PIN1
Available structures
PDB	Ortholog search: PDBe RCSB
PDB	List of PDB id codes 1F8A, 1I6C, 1I8G, 1I8H, 1NMV, 1NMW, 1PIN, 1ZCN, 2F21, 2ITK, 2KBU, 2KCF, 2LB3, 2M8I, 2M8J, 2M9E, 2M9F, 2M9I, 2M9J, 2Q5A, 2RUC, 2RUD, 2XP3, 2XP4, 2XP5, 2XP6, 2XP7, 2XP8, 2XP9, 2XPA, 2XPB, 2ZQS, 2ZQT, 2ZQU, 2ZQV, 2ZR4, 2ZR5, 2ZR6, 3I6C, 3IK8, 3IKD, 3IKG, 3JYJ, 3KAB, 3KAC, 3KAD, 3KAF, 3KAG, 3KAH, 3KAI, 3KCE, 3NTP, 3ODK, 3OOB, 3TC5, 3TCZ, 3TDB, 3WH0, 4GWT, 4GWV, 4QIB, 4TNS, 4TYO, 4U84, 4U85, 4U86, 2RUQ, 2N1O, 2RUR
Enzyme activity
EC #	BRENDA	ExPASy	KEGG	MetaCyc
5.2.1.8	↗	↗	↗	↗

Gene location (Human)
Chr.	Chromosome 19 (human)
Band	19p13.2	Start	9,835,257 bp
Band	19p13.2	End	9,849,689 bp

Gene location (Mouse)
Chr.	Chromosome 9 (mouse)
Band	9 A3|9 7.6 cM	Start	20,563,391 bp
Band	9 A3|9 7.6 cM	End	20,577,880 bp
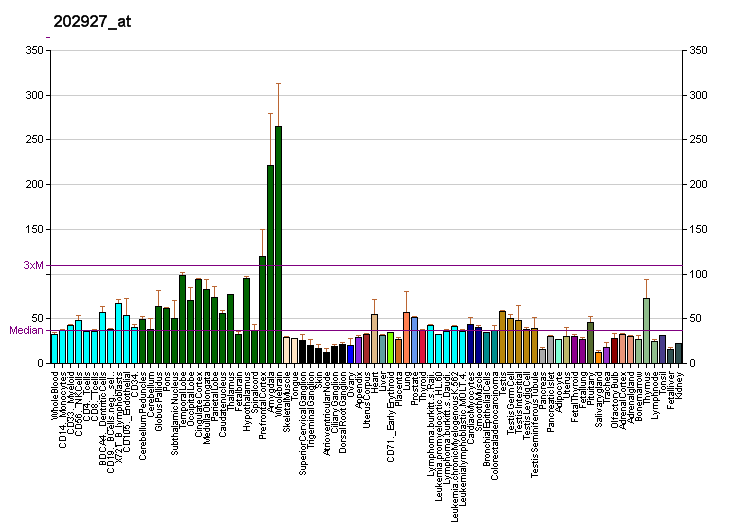
RNA expression pattern
Bgee	Human / Mouse (ortholog); Top expressed in: right frontal lobe; frontal pole; prefrontal cortex; anterior cingulate cortex; right testis; dorsolateral prefrontal cortex; left testis; right hemisphere of cerebellum; Brodmann area 9; nucleus accumbens / Top expressed in: primary motor cortex; anterior amygdaloid area; somite; cingulate gyrus; medial vestibular nucleus; deep cerebellar nuclei; lateral septal nucleus; soleus muscle; prefrontal cortex; medial ganglionic eminence; More reference expression data
BioGPS	More reference expression data
Gene ontology
Molecular function	GTPase activating protein binding; beta-catenin binding; isomerase activity; peptidyl-prolyl cis-trans isomerase activity; protein binding; mitogen-activated protein kinase kinase binding; cytoskeletal motor activity; phosphoserine residue binding; phosphothreonine residue binding; tau protein binding; phosphoprotein binding; cis-trans isomerase activity
Cellular component	cytoplasm; cytosol; nuclear speck; midbody; mitochondrion; neuron projection; nucleus; nucleoplasm; glutamatergic synapse; postsynaptic cytosol
Biological process	negative regulation of neuron apoptotic process; positive regulation of protein phosphorylation; regulation of cytokinesis; positive regulation of protein dephosphorylation; negative regulation of protein catabolic process; positive regulation of canonical Wnt signaling pathway; synapse organization; negative regulation of cell motility; protein stabilization; negative regulation of transforming growth factor beta receptor signaling pathway; negative regulation of protein binding; protein peptidyl-prolyl isomerization; regulation of protein localization to nucleus; positive regulation of GTPase activity; positive regulation of neuron apoptotic process; positive regulation of ubiquitin-protein transferase activity; neuron differentiation; negative regulation of ERK1 and ERK2 cascade; cell cycle; negative regulation of type I interferon production; positive regulation of cell growth involved in cardiac muscle cell development; regulation of pathway-restricted SMAD protein phosphorylation; positive regulation of transcription by RNA polymerase II; regulation of mitotic nuclear division; regulation of signal transduction by p53 class mediator; regulation of protein phosphorylation; regulation of gene expression; positive regulation of protein binding; microtubule polymerization; response to hypoxia; regulation of protein stability; negative regulation of amyloid-beta formation
Sources:Amigo / QuickGO
Orthologs
Databases	NCBI: entry; OMA: entry
Species	Human	Mouse
Entrez	5300	23988
Ensembl	ENSG00000127445	ENSMUSG00000032171
UniProt	Q13526	Q9QUR7
RefSeq (mRNA)	NM_006221	NM_023371; NM_001364495
RefSeq (protein)	NP_006212	NP_075860; NP_001351424
Location (UCSC)	Chr 19: 9.84 – 9.85 Mb	Chr 9: 20.56 – 20.58 Mb
PubMed search
- Wikidata
View/Edit Human	View/Edit Mouse

Peptidyl-prolyl cis-trans isomerase NIMA-interacting 1 (Pin1) is an isomerase enzyme that in humans is encoded by the PIN1 gene.

Pin1 isomerizes only phospho-Serine/Threonine-Proline motifs. The enzyme binds to a subset of proteins and thus plays a role as a post phosphorylation control in regulating protein function. Studies have shown that the deregulation of Pin1 may play a pivotal role in various diseases. Notably, the up-regulation of Pin1 is implicated in certain cancers, and the down-regulation of Pin1 is implicated in Alzheimer's disease. Inhibitors of Pin1 may have therapeutic implications for cancer and immune disorders.

== Discovery ==
The gene encoding Pin1 was identified in 1996 as a result of a genetic/biochemical screen for proteins involved in mitotic regulation. It was found to be essential for cell division in some organisms. By 1999, however, it was apparent that Pin1 knockout mice had a surprisingly mild phenotype, indicating that the enzyme was not required for cell division per se. Further studies later found that loss of Pin1 in mice displays are not only neuronal degenerative phenotypes but also several abnormalities, similar to those of cyclin D1-null mice, suggesting the conformation changes mediated by Pin1 may be crucial for cell normal function.

== Activation ==
Phosphorylation of Ser/Thr-Pro motifs in substrates is required for recognition by Pin1. Pin is a small protein at 18 kDa and does not have a nuclear localization or export signal. However, 2009, Lufei et al. reported that Pin1 has putative novel nuclear localization signal (NLS) and Pin1 interacts with importin α5 (KPNA1). Substrate interactions and a WW domain determine subcellular distribution. Expression is induced by growth signals from E2F transcription factors. Expression levels fluctuate in normal, but not in cancerous cells. Expression is often associated with cell proliferation. Post-translational modifications such as phosphorylation on Ser16 inhibit the ability of Pin1 to bind substrate, and this inhibitory process may be altered during oncogenesis. It is hypothesized, but not proven, that Pin1 might also be regulated by proteolytic pathways.

== Function ==
Pin1 activity regulates the outcome of proline-directed kinase (e.g. MAPK, CDK or GSK3) signalling and consequently regulates cell proliferation (in part through control of cyclin D1 levels and stability) and cell survival. The precise effects of Pin1 depend upon the system: Pin1 accelerates dephosphorylation of Cdc25 and Tau, but protects phosphorylated cyclin D from ubiquitination and proteolysis. Recent data also implicate Pin1 as playing an important role in immune responses, at least in part by increasing the stability of cytokine mRNAs by influencing the protein complexes to which they bind. Pin1 has been hypothesized to act as a molecular timer.

== Inhibition ==
Pin1 has been widely investigated as an interesting molecular target for the inhibition of cancer cell lines, such as breast, cervical, ovarian, and endometrial cancers. Studies have demonstrated that all-trans retinoic acid (ATRA), a natural compound derivative from Vitamin A is involved with PIN1 inhibition. Furthermore, ATRA has also been reported to synergistically enhanced the ability of sorafenib to reduce Pin1 and inhibit cancer growth. Some elemonic acid derivatives have also been reported with inhibitory activity against PIN1. Some computational evidence has also demonstrated that some triterpenoids from neem could also inhibit PIN1 in a similar manner to elemonic acid derivatives

== Interactions ==
Pin1 has been shown to interact with:

- C-jun,
- CDC25C,
- CDC27,
- CSNK2A2,
- Casein kinase 2, alpha 1,
- DAB2,
- eNOS,
- FOXO4,
- MPHOSPH1,
- MYT1,
- Mothers against decapentaplegic homolog 2,
- Mothers against decapentaplegic homolog 3
- P53,
- PKMYT1,
- PLK1,
- SUPT5H,
- Telomeric repeat-binding factor 1, and
- Wee1-like protein kinase.
