= Mitosis inducer protein kinase cdr2 =

Cdr2

Identifiers
- Organism: Schizosaccharomyces pombe
- Symbol: SPAC57A10.02
- Entrez: 2541590

Cdr2 is a serine/threonine protein kinase mitotic regulator in the fission yeast S. pombe. It is encoded by the P87050 2247 bp open reading frame (ORF) on the cosmid 57A10. The protein is 775 amino acids in length. Cdr2 is a member of the GIN4 family of kinases, which prevent progression of mitosis if there is a problem with septin. The N-terminus contains a sequence characteristic of serine/threonine protein kinase activity. The C-terminus, while non-catalytic, is necessary for proper localization of Cdr2 during interphase.

Cdr2 null constructs behave similarly to wild-type constructs; the only difference being a slight delay into mitosis and consequently, cells are slightly larger than in wild-type constructs. Therefore, Cdr2 is non-essential. Cdr2 regulates mitotic entry through direct inhibition of Wee1, which is then unable to continue to Cdk1 and subsequently start mitosis.

== Cell localization ==
During interphase (G1, S, G2), Cdr2 is localized in a wide medial band that is centered on the cell nucleus. The C-terminus (carboxy terminus) is required for correct localization; cleavage of any number of residues close to the carboxy terminus results in abnormal distribution. Pom1 phosphorylates Cdr2 on the C-terminus, and prevents it from spreading beyond the medial band. The width of the cortical band increases proportionately with the length of the growing cell; the final limit is at approximately 30% of the total cell length before the cell enters mitosis. When the cell enters mitosis, Cdr2 is distributed diffusely through the cytoplasm; there is no detectable cortical band in metaphase in anaphase. During septation at the end of anaphase, Cdr2 localizes to the contractile ring. After cytokinesis, Cdr2 is again distributed in a broad medial band centered on the nucleus.

== Regulation of mitotic entry ==
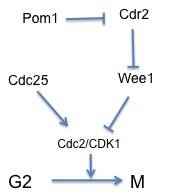
Figure 1: Accepted Model for Cdr2's indirect promotion of mitotic entry. Cdr2 is suppressed by Pom1, and is unable to phosphorylate Wee1 to activate CDK1.

Pom1 is a serine/threonine protein kinase that localizes to the cell tips. It is a partial mechanism for the formation of the medial distribution of Cdr2 in the cell; Pom1 has been demonstrated to prevent Cdr2 from diffusing into the non-growing end of the cell in interphase. As seen in figure 1, Pom1 directly inhibits Cdr2. This is done through phosphorylation of Cdr2 on a residue between 423 and 532 on the non-catalytic C-terminus. Once phosphorylated, Cdr2 is unable to inhibit the kinase Wee1, which is then able to maintain CDK1 in a hyper-phosphorylated state incapable of progression into mitosis. Mutation and deletion of Cdr2 result in a delay into mitotic entry, leading to larger cells. However, the cells still enter mitosis, presumably because Cdr2 is the link in only one pathway that couples cell length to mitotic entry. Thus, Cdr2 is non-essential to the decision to enter mitosis.

== Interaction with Pom1 gradient ==
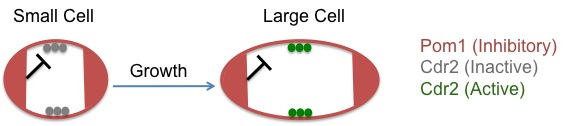
Figure 2: Difference in Pom1 and Cdr2 overlap in small cells and big cells.

Pom1 is distributed in a gradient from the cell tips, with the maximum concentration in the cell tips and the lower concentrations in the medial region of the cell, roughly overlapping with the wide medial band occupied by Cdr2. In small cells, there is a higher level of overlap between Pom1 and Cdr2, leading to a greater degree of inhibition of Cdr2; conversely Cdr2 is unable to inhibit Wee1, which is then free to inhibit CDK1. Therefore, Cdr2 functions as part of a cell-size sensor pathway. In larger cells, there is much lower degree of overlap between Pom1 and Cdr2, allowing Cdr2 to inhibit Wee1; CDK1 is then able to promote mitotic entry.
