= Prexasertib =

Chemical compound

Clinical data
- Pregnancy category: IV
- ATC code: none

Identifiers
- IUPAC name: 5-((5-(2-(3-Aminopropoxy)-6-methoxyphenyl)-1H-pyrazol-3-yl)amino)-2-pyrazinecarbonitrile
- CAS Number: 1234015-52-1
- ChemSpider: 32738771
- UNII: 820NH671E6
- KEGG: D11206
- CompTox Dashboard (EPA): DTXSID301031326

Chemical and physical data
- Formula: C_{18}H_{19}N_{7}O_{2}
- Molar mass: 365.397 g·mol^{−1}
- 3D model (JSmol): Interactive image
- SMILES: C1=C(C(=C(C=C1)OC)C1=CC(=NN1)NC1=NC=C(N=C1)C#N)OCCCN
- InChI: InChI=1S/C18H19N7O2/c1-26-14-4-2-5-15(27-7-3-6-19)18(14)13-8-16(25-24-13)23-17-11-21-12(9-20)10-22-17/h2,4-5,8,10-11H,3,6-7,19H2,1H3,(H2,22,23,24,25); Key:DOTGPNHGTYJDEP-UHFFFAOYSA-N

Prexasertib (LY2606368) is a small molecule checkpoint kinase inhibitor, mainly active against CHEK1, with minor activity against CHEK2. This causes induction of DNA double-strand breaks resulting in apoptosis. It was developed by Eli Lilly but the company announced in 2019 it was dropping prexasertib from active development, although clinical trials continue. Research continues into the efficacy of prexasertib in treatment of acute myeloid leukemia, myelodysplastic syndrome, rhabdomyosarcoma, and medulloblastoma.
