= CDR2 =

CDR2 can refer to

- Complementarity-determining region 2 on antibodies
- CDR2 (gene), cerebellar degeneration-related protein 2, a protein expressed by ovarian cancer cells
- Mitosis inducer protein kinase cdr2, Cdr2 (S. pombe), a protein in the yeast S. pombe
