= Potrasertib =

Clinical data
- Other names: IMP7068

Identifiers
- IUPAC name: 7-(2,6-dichlorophenyl)-12-[3-methyl-4-[(3S,5R)-3,4,5-trimethylpiperazin-1-yl]anilino]-2,5,7,11,13-pentazatricyclo[7.4.0.02,6]trideca-1(13),5,9,11-tetraen-8-one
- CAS Number: 2226938-19-6
- PubChem CID: 139503236
- UNII: 621K13UG4B

Chemical and physical data
- Formula: C_{28}H_{30}Cl_{2}N_{8}O
- Molar mass: 565.50 g·mol^{−1}
- 3D model (JSmol): Interactive image
- SMILES: C[C@@H]1CN(C[C@@H](N1C)C)C2=C(C=C(C=C2)NC3=NC=C4C(=N3)N5CCN=C5N(C4=O)C6=C(C=CC=C6Cl)Cl)C
- InChI: InChI=InChI=1S/C28H30Cl2N8O/c1-16-12-19(8-9-23(16)36-14-17(2)35(4)18(3)15-36)33-27-32-13-20-25(34-27)37-11-10-31-28(37)38(26(20)39)24-21(29)6-5-7-22(24)30/h5-9,12-13,17-18H,10-11,14-15H2,1-4H3,(H,32,33,34)/t17-,18+; Key:BNVDJVMTLDUCGH-HDICACEKSA-N

Potrasertib is an investigational new drug that is being evaluated by IMPACT Therapeutics for the treatment of advanced solid tumors. It is an orally administered inhibitor of WEE1 kinase, a key regulator of cell cycle checkpoints.
