= PLK3 =

Protein found in humans

Identifiers
- Aliases: PLK3, CNK, FNK, PRK, PLK-3, polo like kinase 3
- External IDs: OMIM: 602913; MGI: 109604; GeneCards: PLK3
Available structures
PDB	Ortholog search: PDBe RCSB
PDB	List of PDB id codes 4B6L
Enzyme activity
EC #	BRENDA	ExPASy	KEGG	MetaCyc
2.7.11.21	↗	↗	↗	↗

Gene location (Human)
Chr.	Chromosome 1 (human)
Band	1p34.1	Start	44,800,377 bp
Band	1p34.1	End	44,805,990 bp

Gene location (Mouse)
Chr.	Chromosome 4 (mouse)
Band	4|4 D1	Start	116,985,852 bp
Band	4|4 D1	End	116,991,160 bp
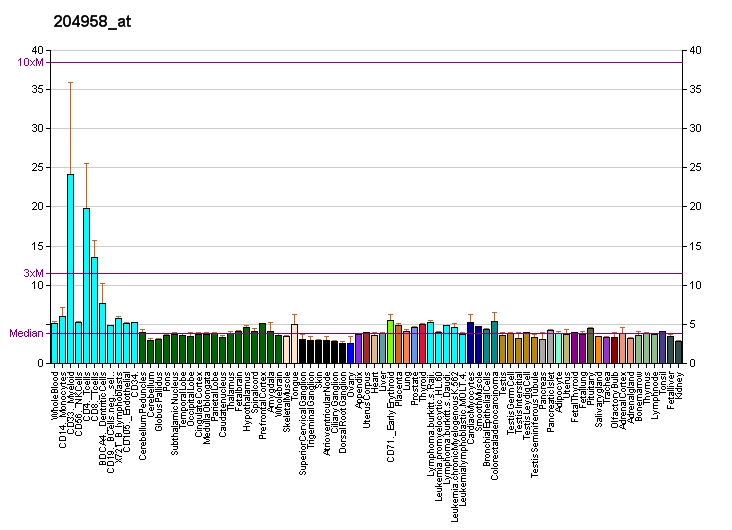

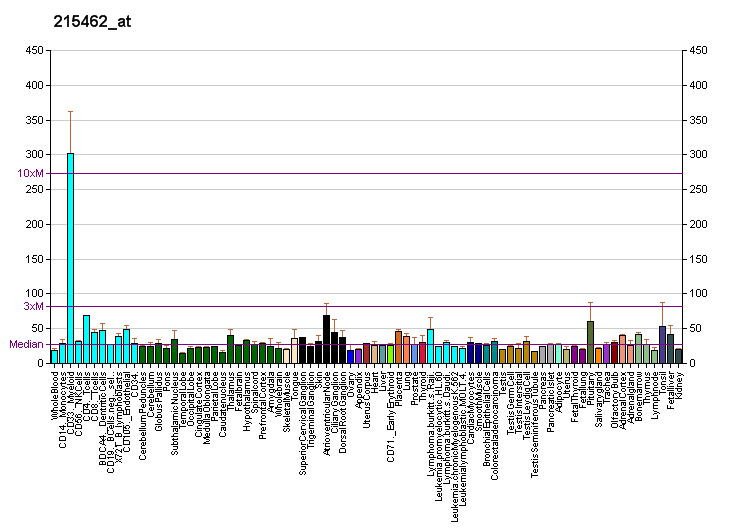
RNA expression pattern
Bgee	Human / Mouse (ortholog); Top expressed in: oocyte; gastric mucosa; ascending aorta; left uterine tube; gallbladder; upper lobe of left lung; skin of abdomen; Descending thoracic aorta; monocyte; secondary oocyte / Top expressed in: perirhinal cortex; entorhinal cortex; CA3 field; granulocyte; lactiferous gland; choroid plexus of fourth ventricle; lip; left lobe of liver; decidua; esophagus; More reference expression data
BioGPS	More reference expression data
Gene ontology
Molecular function	transferase activity; nucleotide binding; protein kinase activity; p53 binding; kinase activity; protein serine/threonine kinase activity; protein binding; ATP binding
Cellular component	cytoplasm; centrosome; Golgi apparatus; microtubule organizing center; soma; dendrite; nucleolus; Golgi stack; cytoskeleton; nucleus; nucleoplasm; spindle pole
Biological process	positive regulation of intracellular protein transport; regulation of cytokinesis; regulation of cell division; protein kinase B signaling; phosphorylation; response to reactive oxygen species; mitotic cell cycle checkpoint signaling; mitotic G1/S transition checkpoint signaling; positive regulation of proteasomal ubiquitin-dependent protein catabolic process involved in cellular response to hypoxia; negative regulation of apoptotic process; negative regulation of transcription by RNA polymerase II; cellular response to DNA damage stimulus; response to osmotic stress; protein phosphorylation; G2/M transition of mitotic cell cycle; cytoplasmic microtubule organization; endomitotic cell cycle; cell cycle; response to radiation; Golgi disassembly; apoptotic process; DNA damage response, signal transduction by p53 class mediator resulting in cell cycle arrest; regulation of signal transduction by p53 class mediator; positive regulation of chaperone-mediated autophagy; G1/S transition of mitotic cell cycle; mitotic cell cycle
Sources:Amigo / QuickGO
Orthologs
Databases	NCBI: entry; OMA: entry
Species	Human	Mouse
Entrez	1263	12795
Ensembl	ENSG00000173846	ENSMUSG00000028680
UniProt	Q9H4B4	Q60806
RefSeq (mRNA)	NM_004073	NM_013807; NM_001313916
RefSeq (protein)	NP_004064	n/a
Location (UCSC)	Chr 1: 44.8 – 44.81 Mb	Chr 4: 116.99 – 116.99 Mb
PubMed search
- Wikidata
View/Edit Human	View/Edit Mouse

Polo-like kinase 3 (Drosophila), also known as PLK3, is an enzyme which in humans is encoded by the PLK3 gene.

== Function ==
Cytokine-inducible kinase is a putative serine/threonine kinase. CNK contains both a catalytic domain and a putative regulatory domain. It may play a role in regulation of cell cycle progression and tumorigenesis.

== Interactions ==
PLK3 has been shown to interact with:

- CDC25C,
- CHEK2, and
- P53.
