= Polo-like kinase =

Polo-like kinases (Plks) are regulatory serine/threonine kinases of the cell cycle involved in mitotic entry, mitotic exit, spindle formation, cytokinesis, and meiosis. Only one Plk is found in the genomes of the fly Drosophila melanogaster (Polo), budding yeast (Cdc5) and fission yeast (Plo1). Vertebrates and other animals, however, have many Plk family members including Plk1 (Xenopus Plx1), Plk2/Snk (Xenopus Plx2), Plk3/Prk/FnK (Xenopus Plx3), Plk4/Sak and Plk5. Of the vertebrate Plk family members, the mammalian Plk1 has been most extensively studied. During mitosis and cytokinesis, Plks associate with several structures including the centrosome, kinetochores, and the central spindle.

== Structure ==
The catalytic serine/threonine kinase domain of Plk is at the N-terminus of the polo-like kinase protein. A regulatory domain containing two signature motifs, known as polo box domains, is located at the C-terminus. The polo-box domain (PBD) helps with specificity of substrate and localizes Plk to specific mitotic structures during mitosis. These include the centrosomes in early M phase, the spindle midzone in early and late anaphase and the midbody during cytokinesis.

== Regulation ==
Plks are controlled at the level of protein synthesis and degradation, by the action of upstream kinases and phosphatases, and by localization to specific subcellular structures. Plks are activated by phosphorylation within a short region of the catalytic domain called the T-loop (or activation loop), with several serine/threonine phosphorylation sites in the loop identified. Polo-like kinase kinase 1 (Plkk1) and protein kinase A (PKA) have been shown to be able to phosphorylate Plk1 in vitro. The polo-box domain (PBD) of Plk1 is a phosphopeptide-binding motif. This means that in the absence of a phosphorylated ligand, the PBD interacts with the catalytic domain thereby preventing substrate binding or kinase activation. Occupancy of the PBD by an exogenous phosphopeptide ligand would then cause the release of the catalytic domain, which, together with phosphorylation on the T-loop, converts Plk to the active form. On exit from mitosis, Plks are proteolytically degraded through the ubiquitin-proteasome pathway after coming in contact with the ubiquitin-ligase Anaphase Promoting Complex (APC).

== Mitosis ==
Plks have been found to cooperate with Cdks in the orchestration of cell division. Entry into M phase is controlled through the activation of cyclin-dependent kinase 1 (CDK1)–cyclin B, and Cdc25 is a phosphatase that dephosphorylates Cdk1 to promote mitotic entry. Plk1 binds to phosphorylated Cdc25 through its PBD. Thus Plks can phosphorylate Cdc25 and thereby regulate Cdc25 and indirectly Cdk1. A study shows that phosphorylation of a serine residue (Ser198) within a nuclear-export signal of Cdc25 promotes the nuclear accumulation of Ccdc25 in humans. PBD has high affinity for proteins already phosphorylated at certain serine/threonine sites. This requires priming of substrates by Plk itself or other kinases such as Cdk1 to create a docking site. However, there could also be phosphorylation-independent structural aspects contributing to binding. Plo1 (the Plk found in fission yeast) is part of a positive-feedback loop that controls the expression of genes that are required for cell division.

Plk has also been shown to be needed at the G2/M transition. Spindle pole formation needs Plk1, and some proteins such as gamma-tubulin fail to recruit spindle poles in the absence of Plk1 for centrosome maturation. Several other potential Plk1 substrates and binding partners that are implicated in microtubule nucleation and dynamics have also been identified including the microtubule-severing protein katanin, the microtubule-stabilizing protein TCTP and the microtubule-destabilizing protein stathmin.

Plk is also needed for successful chromosome separation and exit from mitosis. Plk cooperates with Cdk1 in the control of several APC subunits. Human PLK1 phosphorylates early mitotic inhibitor 1 (EMI1), an inhibitor of the APC. Impairment of Plk function generally interferes with the normal onset of anaphase, indicating that Plks contribute to the control of APC activity. Plk1 associates with kinetochores during mitosis. In the absence of Plk1 function, bipolar spindle formation does not occur and cells arrest in prometaphase owing to Spindle Assembly Checkpoint activation. Plk1 function may be important for relieving the inhibitory checkpoint signal. If so, Plk1 could contribute to the resumption of mitotic progression on complete attachment of all chromosomes to the spindle apparatus.

== Meiosis ==
The fly and yeast models have revealed that Polo kinases coordinate the more complex pattern of chromosome segregation in meiosis. Budding yeast Cdc5 is required in meiosis I for the removal of cohesins from chromosome arms, for the co-orientation of homologous chromosomes, and for the resolution of crossovers. Cdc5 (Plk found in budding yeast) directly phosphorylates the meiotic cohesin and promotes its dissociation from the chromosome arms to allow for recombination but not from the centromeric region in meiosis I. In some yeast cdc5 mutants, bipolar rather than monopolar attachment of the sister kinetochores occurs during meiosis I because a complex of proteins called monopolins fails to localize to the kinetochore.

== Cytokinesis ==
The involvement of Polo kinases in the process of cytokinesis was first shown in fission yeast, in which the overexpression of Plo1 drives septation at any stage of the cell cycle and plo1 mutants fail to septate. A protein called Mid1 determines where the contractile ring forms has been shown to shuttle out of the nucleus due to phosphorylation of Plk. Recent studies on the role of mammalian Plk1 in cytokinesis have also identified kinesin-related motor Mklp2 and dynein subcomponent NudC as potential substrates of Plk1 that interact with the PBD. Both Mklp2 and NudC have associated motor-protein activity and both localize to the central spindle. PLK1 has been found to phosphorylate the centralspindlin subunit CYK4 at the spindle midzone, thereby allowing the recruitment of the Rho guanine nucleotide-exchange factor (GEF) ECT2 to promote RhoA activation and thus actomyosin contraction of the ring.

== See also ==
- PLK1
- Polo kinase
