= MYT1 =

Protein-coding gene in the species Homo sapiens

Identifiers
- Aliases: MYT1, C20orf36, MTF1, MYTI, NZF2, PLPB1, ZC2HC4A, ZC2H2C1, myelin transcription factor 1
- External IDs: OMIM: 600379; MGI: 1100535; GeneCards: MYT1
Available structures
PDB	Ortholog search: PDBe RCSB
PDB	List of PDB id codes 2JX1, 2JYD, 2MF8

Gene location (Human)
Chr.	Chromosome 20 (human)
Band	20q13.33	Start	64,102,394 bp
Band	20q13.33	End	64,242,253 bp

Gene location (Mouse)
Chr.	Chromosome 2 (mouse)
Band	2 H4|2 103.77 cM	Start	181,763,332 bp
Band	2 H4|2 103.77 cM	End	181,827,797 bp
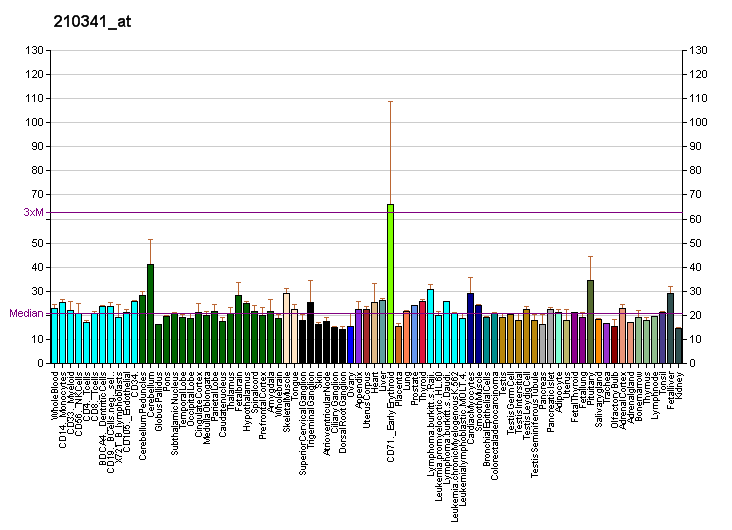

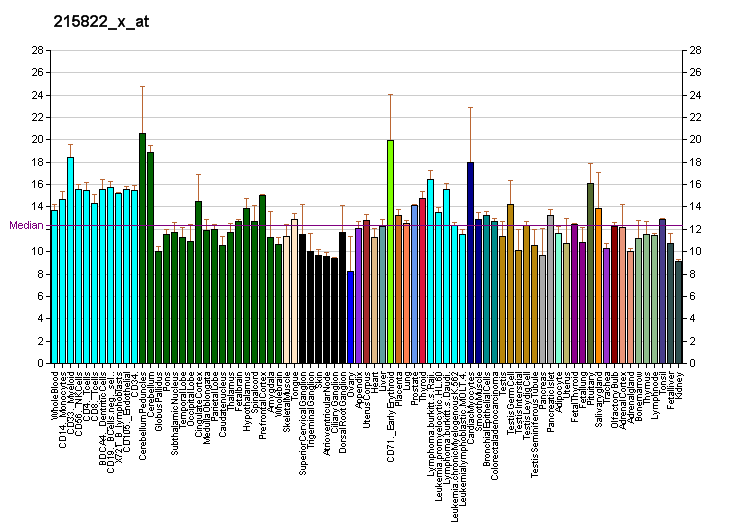
RNA expression pattern
Bgee	Human / Mouse (ortholog); Top expressed in: ganglionic eminence; cerebellum; cerebellar hemisphere; right hemisphere of cerebellum; hypothalamus; amygdala; substantia nigra; nucleus accumbens; testicle; islet of Langerhans / Top expressed in: lumbar spinal ganglion; Rostral migratory stream; ganglionic eminence; neural layer of retina; ventricular zone; medial ganglionic eminence; zygote; autonomic nervous system; superior cervical ganglion; trigeminal ganglion; More reference expression data
BioGPS	More reference expression data
Gene ontology
Molecular function	DNA-binding transcription factor activity; zinc ion binding; metal ion binding; DNA binding; DNA-binding transcription factor activity, RNA polymerase II-specific; RNA polymerase II transcription regulatory region sequence-specific DNA binding; DNA-binding transcription repressor activity, RNA polymerase II-specific; DNA-binding transcription activator activity, RNA polymerase II-specific
Cellular component	nucleus; nucleoplasm; cytosol
Biological process	multicellular organism development; nervous system development; regulation of transcription, DNA-templated; cell differentiation; transcription, DNA-templated; regulation of transcription by RNA polymerase II; negative regulation of transcription by RNA polymerase II; positive regulation of transcription by RNA polymerase II
Sources:Amigo / QuickGO
Orthologs
Databases	NCBI: entry; OMA: entry
Species	Human	Mouse
Entrez	4661	17932
Ensembl	ENSG00000196132	ENSMUSG00000010505
UniProt	Q01538	Q8CFC2
RefSeq (mRNA)	NM_004535	NM_001171615; NM_001171616; NM_001171680; NM_008665
RefSeq (protein)	NP_004526	NP_001165086; NP_001165087; NP_001165151; NP_032691
Location (UCSC)	Chr 20: 64.1 – 64.24 Mb	Chr 2: 181.76 – 181.83 Mb
PubMed search
- Wikidata
View/Edit Human	View/Edit Mouse

Myelin transcription factor 1 is a protein that in humans is encoded by the MYT1 gene.

== Function ==
The protein encoded by this gene is a member of a family of neural specific, zinc finger-containing DNA-binding proteins. The protein binds to the promoter regions of proteolipid proteins of the central nervous system and plays a role in the developing nervous system.

== Interactive pathway map ==
Click on genes, proteins and metabolites below to visit related articles. (Note: The interactive pathway map can be edited at WikiPathways: "WP3584".)

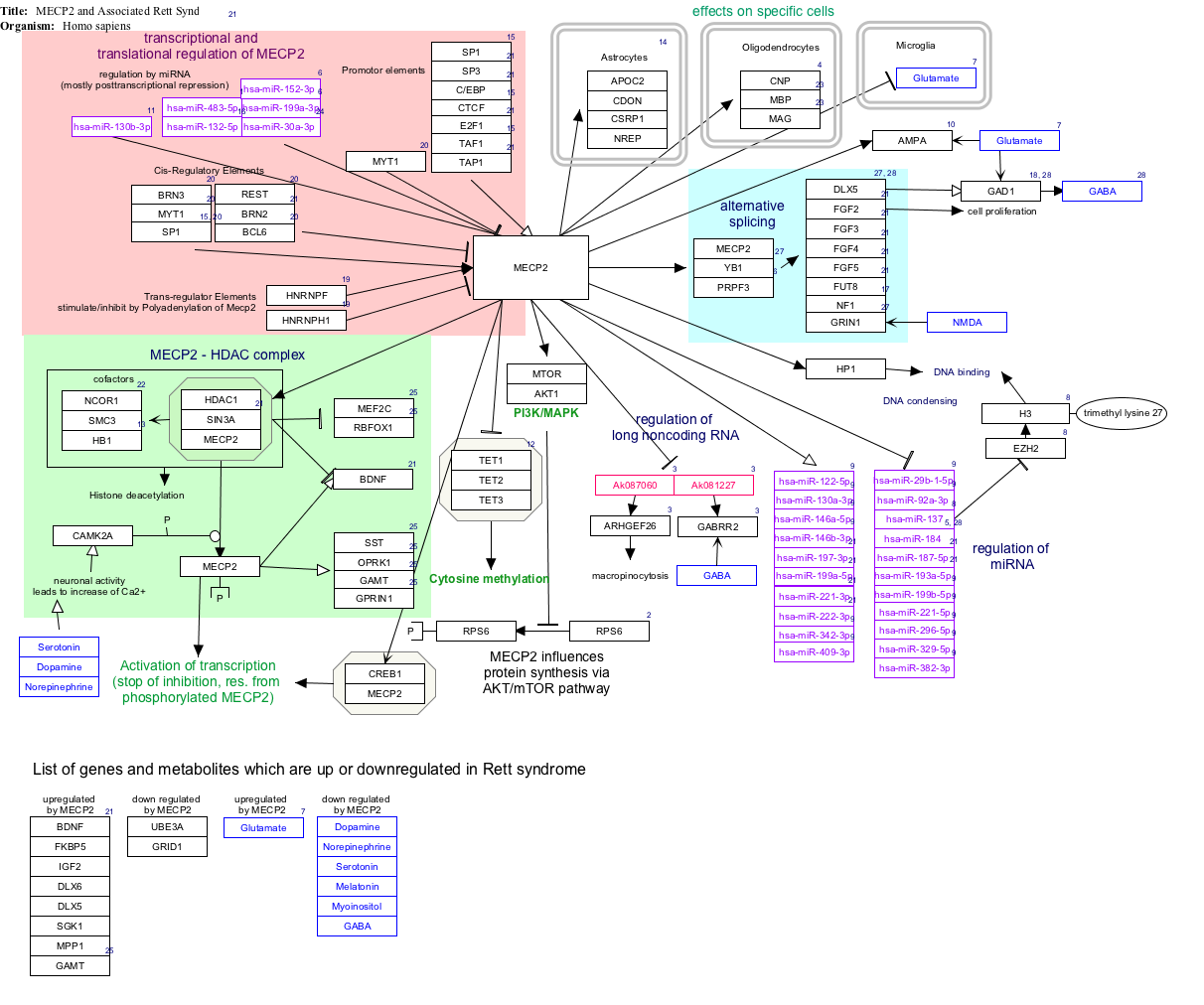

MECP2 and associated Rett syndrome edit

== Interactions ==
MYT1 has been shown to interact with PIN1.
