= KIF20B =

Motor protein found in humans

Identifiers
- Aliases: KIF20B, CT90, KRMP1, MPHOSPH1, MPP-1, MPP1, kinesin family member 20B
- External IDs: OMIM: 605498; MGI: 2444576; GeneCards: KIF20B

Gene location (Human)
Chr.	Chromosome 10 (human)
Band	10q23.31	Start	89,701,590 bp
Band	10q23.31	End	89,774,939 bp

Gene location (Mouse)
Chr.	Chromosome 19 (mouse)
Band	19|19 C1	Start	34,899,761 bp
Band	19|19 C1	End	34,953,145 bp
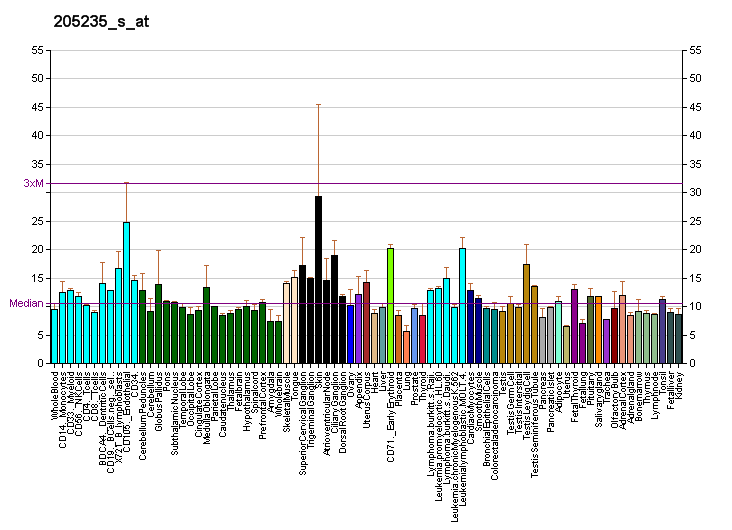
RNA expression pattern
Bgee	Human / Mouse (ortholog); Top expressed in: testicle; oocyte; secondary oocyte; gonad; ventricular zone; Achilles tendon; ganglionic eminence; trabecular bone; bone marrow cell; skin of thigh / Top expressed in: genital tubercle; tail of embryo; secondary oocyte; zygote; hand; ventricular zone; primary oocyte; spermatocyte; lumbar spinal ganglion; morula; More reference expression data
BioGPS	More reference expression data
Gene ontology
Molecular function	nucleotide binding; microtubule motor activity; protein homodimerization activity; microtubule binding; ATPase activity; protein binding; WW domain binding; plus-end-directed microtubule motor activity; ATP binding
Cellular component	cytoplasm; centrosome; mitotic spindle pole; cell projection; spindle pole; contractile ring; kinesin complex; growth cone; microtubule cytoskeleton; spindle; nucleoplasm; microtubule organizing center; mitotic spindle midzone; axon; midbody; nucleolus; spindle midzone; perinuclear region of cytoplasm; microtubule; cytoskeleton; nucleus
Biological process	positive regulation of intracellular protein transport; neuron projection morphogenesis; cell division; positive regulation of cytokinesis; positive regulation of neuron migration; microtubule-based movement; positive regulation of mitotic cytokinetic process; neural tube closure; protein localization to microtubule; regulation of establishment of protein localization; positive regulation of cell population proliferation; regulation of neuron migration; cell cycle; regulation of establishment of cell polarity; regulation of mitotic nuclear division
Sources:Amigo / QuickGO
Orthologs
Databases	NCBI: entry; OMA: entry
Species	Human	Mouse
Entrez	9585	240641
Ensembl	ENSG00000138182	ENSMUSG00000024795
UniProt	Q96Q89	Q80WE4
RefSeq (mRNA)	NM_016195; NM_001284259; NM_001382506	NM_183046; NM_001362434
RefSeq (protein)	NP_001271188; NP_057279; NP_001369435	NP_898867; NP_001349363
Location (UCSC)	Chr 10: 89.7 – 89.77 Mb	Chr 19: 34.9 – 34.95 Mb
PubMed search
- Wikidata
View/Edit Human	View/Edit Mouse

Kinesin family member 20B is a protein that in humans is encoded by the KIF20B gene.

== Interactions ==
KIF20B has been shown to interact with PIN1.
