= Polo kinase =

Class of enzymes

Identifiers
- EC no.: 2.7.11.21

Databases
- IntEnz: IntEnz view
- BRENDA: BRENDA entry
- ExPASy: NiceZyme view
- KEGG: KEGG entry
- MetaCyc: metabolic pathway
- PRIAM: profile
- PDB structures: RCSB PDB PDBe PDBsum
Search
- PMC: articles
- PubMed: articles
- NCBI: proteins

In enzymology, a polo kinase (EC 2.7.11.21) is a kinase enzyme i.e. one that catalyzes the chemical reaction

ATP + a protein $\rightleftharpoons$ ADP + a phosphoprotein

Thus, the two substrates of these enzymes are ATP and protein, whereas their two products are ADP and phosphoprotein.

These enzymes belong to the family of transferases, specifically those transferring a phosphate group to the sidechain oxygen atom of serine or threonine residues in proteins (protein-serine/threonine kinases).

The systematic name of this [polo[-like] kinase] enzyme class is ATP:protein phosphotransferase (spindle-pole-dependent).

Examples and other names in common use include Cdc5, Cdc5p, Plk, PLK, Plk1, Plo1, POLO kinase, polo serine-threonine kinase, polo-like kinase, polo-like kinase 1, serine/threonine-specific Drosophila kinase polo, and STK21.

These enzymes participate in 3 metabolic pathways: cell cycle, cell cycle - yeast, and progesterone-mediated oocyte maturation.

== Structural studies ==
As of late 2007, 5 structures have been solved for this class of enzymes, with PDB accession codes 2OGQ, 2OJS, 2OJX, 2OU7, and 2OWB.
