= Pom1 =

Identifiers
- Organism: Schizosaccharomyces pombe
- Symbol: SPAC2F7.03c
- Entrez: 2541889

Pom1 is a polarity protein kinase in fission yeast, Schizosaccharomyces pombe (S. pombe), that localizes to cell ends and regulates cell division. As the cell lengthens, the level of Pom1 in the middle declines, which triggers mitosis.

The gene pom1 codes for a protein 1087 amino acids long with the protein kinase domain likely located at the carboxyl terminus. Pom1 regulates a signaling pathway that includes Cdk1 and ultimately regulates mitotic entry. Cells with mutant pom1 form a septa and growth zone, but show a host of abnormalities including misplaced or misoriented septa, bi-polar growth replaced with random growth at one end, or the mislocalization of the growth axis leading to abnormal branching.

Pom1 plays an important role in differentiating the old and new end of an S. pombe cell. Normal cell growth begins immediately in the old end of the cell and is delayed in the new end. pom1 mutants show immediate growth at both ends. Since Pom1 has been shown to be highly concentrated at the new end and nearly absent from the old end, it, along with other factors are part of an inhibitory signal that prevents immediate growth from the new end. Overexpression of Pom1 can also lead to the formation of new growth ends.

Pom1 is a relatively unique protein kinase as its closest homolog in S. pombe is only 55% identical. Homologs in other organisms include Dyrk in rats, Dyrk2 and Dyrk3 in humans, Yak1p in S. cerevisiae, and Minibrain in Drosophila and humans.

== Cell localization ==
During interphase, Pom1 resides throughout the cell including the medial cortical nodes. Pom1’s localization to the poles during cell division is regulated by Tea1 and Tea2. In the absence of Tea1 and Tea2, Pom1 maintains its kinase activity, but does not localize to the cell ends. Microtubules also help localize Pom1 in the cell as Pom1 delocalization has been shown to result from microtubule disassembly. Structurally, both the catalytic and non-catalytic regions of Pom1 are necessary for cell end localization.

The Cdr2, Cdr1, Wee1, Mid1, and Blt1 proteins are also located at the medial node during interphase and are believed to be part of the signaling pathway for mitotic entry. Cdr2 localization to the cell middle is regulated by the expression of Pom1 and other signals as pom1 mutants allow Cdr2 to diffuse from the medial node localization to one half of the cell.

== Cell Size and Spatial Gradient ==
Figure 1: Putative pathway for Pom1's regulation of mitotic entry. Pom1 suppresses Cdr2 that activates the Cdr1 and the suppression of Wee1. Suppressing Wee1 allows Cdk1 to help the cell enter mitosis.

Pom1 forms a spatial gradient as cells elongate throughout G2 phase. Figure 1 illustrates in cartoon form the gradient of Pom1 (shown by the dark shading) across first a relatively small cell during interphase and an elongated cell passing through G2 phase. As cells elongate, Pom1 concentration peaks at the two poles and diminishes toward the center of the cell. Cdr2 reads the diminishing inhibitory signal from Pom1’s concentration gradient and activates Cdr1 and Blt1 that were localized at the medial node due to Cdr2 recruitment. Cdr1 then phosphorylates and inhibits Wee1, also recruited to the medial node by the presence of Cdr2. The phosphorylated Wee1 allows Cdc25 to dephosphorylate Cdk1 and move the cell into mitosis. Figure 2 depicts a simplified signaling pathway for size-dependent mitotic entry based on this model. The inhibition of Wee1 directly by Cdr2 shown by the dashed line has yet to be confirmed.

== Tests of the Pom1 Model ==
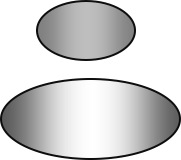
Figure 2: Characterization of Pom1 localization at different points in the cell cycle. Pom1 is represented by the dark gray shading. White regions represent low concentrations of Pom1 after the cell has elongated and Pom1 localizes at the cell ends.

GFP-tagged Pom1 has been shown to create a gradient in elongated cells as characterized in Figure 1. According to Figure 2, the decreased Pom1 at the location of Cdr2 in the medial node decreases the inhibition of Cdr2. In confirmation of this model’s interaction, results show that cells with delocalized Pom1 that retain full kinase activity from tea1 mutants delay mitotic entry. This is likely due to the continued inhibition of Cdr2. Further experiments that ectopically localized Pom1 throughout the cortex also showed delayed mitotic entry equivalent to a cdr2 knockdown suggesting once again that Pom1 inhibits Cdr2 and as Pom1 diminishes with cell elongation, Cdr2 begins a signaling pathway to inhibit Wee1 and eventually enter mitosis.

== Future Research ==
It remains unclear if Cdr2 inhibits Wee1 directly or if it acts only indirectly through Cdr1 or other kinases. Furthermore, Blt1, also localized at the medial node, may play a role in mitotic entry regulation. Blt1 mutants show increased length consistent with delayed mitotic entry. Although currently unconfirmed, it is speculated that Blt1 acts by inhibiting Wee1.
