= Cell cycle withdrawal =

Natural stoppage of cell cycle during cell division

Cell cycle withdrawal refers to the natural stoppage of cell cycle during cell division. When cells divide, there are many internal or external factors that would lead to a stoppage of division. This stoppage could be permanent or temporary, and could occur in any one of the four cycle phases (G1, S, G2 and M), depending on the status of cells or the activities they are undergoing. During the process, all cell duplication process, including mitosis, meiosis as well as DNA replication, will be paused. The mechanisms involve the proteins and DNA sequences inside cells.

== Permanent cell cycle withdrawal ==
Permanent cell cycle withdrawal refers to the forever stoppage in divisions of cells. In organisms, cells do not divide endlessly. Certain mechanisms are present to prevent cells from indefinite division, which is mostly done by programmed failure in DNA synthesis. By adapting the above mechanism, cells are prevented from over dividing. The process also enables cells to proceed to senescence, which are further stages of cell life and growth.

=== Mechanism ===
The permanent cell cycle withdrawal is mainly done by the wearing off of DNA sequences during S Phase, the second stage during a DNA replication progress. Such progress occurs in the end sequences of the whole linear chromosome named telomeres.

Telomeres are sequences of repetitive nucleotides which serve no genetic use. During the replication process, the DNA replication enzymes are not able to copy the ending sequences at the telomere. Those sequences, located at the end of the telomere and chromosome, would hence get lost gradually. Once all of these sequences have been worn out, the useful genetic information in the cell's chromosome would also get lost. This prevents cells from cell dividing, withdrawing cells from the cell division cycle. Therefore, telomeres act as the buffer for cells to continue dividing and when telomeres are worn out, cells lose their dividing function.

Not all cells carry out cell cycle withdrawal. In some cells, such as germ cells, stem cells and white blood cells, the withdrawal process do not occur. This is to ensure that these cells continue dividing for body growth or reproduction. Such phenomena is brought about by the presence of telomerase, which would catalyse the reaction of adding nucleotide sequences to the ends of telomeres. It replenishes the telomeres that are lost during DNA replication, compensating for enough telomerase sequence so that the useful DNA content would not be damaged. This allows such cells to have continuous division. Some other cells do not have the mechanism of cell cycle withdrawal because they don't even contain the function of cell division. Red blood cells, for example, do not contain genetic material when mature, and hence will not carry out cell cycle or its withdrawal.

Some organisms do not have a withdrawal mechanism. Prokaryotes are such examples. The DNA structure in these organisms are in the form of circular chromosomes, meaning there would be no "ends" appearing in their DNA. Therefore, the wearing off of DNA would not occur, and the genetic information would remain the same, and no withdrawal would happen. This is to prevent the stopping of cell division in prokaryotic organisms.

=== Significance ===
There are several significance with regards to the withdrawal of cell cycle, one of which is to prevent unlimited cell division in somatic cells. This is to prevent too many cells from accumulating inside an organism's body, ensuring that cells in different organs are contained in a fixed proportion for achieving optimal function. The stoppage of exponential growth in cells also avoids cell growth diseases, such as tumours or cancer, from occurring in organism bodies. Studies have discovered the linkage between the abnormal replenishing of telomere, overactivity of telomerase, and cancer growth. Here, telomere act as a barrier against cells from dividing abnormally, hence providing a stable environment for body functions. The withdrawal process also prevents diseased cells, or cells with mutated or damaged DNA, from continuing to divide and increasing the percentage of abnormal cells inside the body. It can further allow these cells to stop their functions and differentiations to undergo a programmed cell death process called apoptosis.

Furthermore, the withdrawal process could allow cells to encounter further parts of their cell life, namely senescence and natural apoptosis. During normal body activities, cells divide, grow and differentiate into different cell types and serve different functions. The above procedures are also known as senescence. After senescence, body cells would start to become old, and several functions would be lost during the process. As these cells with limited functions are inefficient in performing body activities, they are programmed to self demolition under the presence of apoptotic signals, such as caspase proteins and Bcl-2 family regulation proteins. Before such process, the cell cycle withdrawal ensures that these aged cells are not divided into other daughter cells before death, so as to maintain the age level of cells in organisms to perform efficient body activities.

== Temporary cell cycle withdrawal ==
Temporary cell cycle withdrawal, also known as cell cycle arrest, refers to the short-term stoppage in cell division. This mechanism often happens in organisms' bodies, mainly due to the reasons of abnormality in growth factors or the replication of DNA. In these cases, the withdrawal starts when abnormality is detected, and ends once the detected errors have been repaired. This process makes sure that cells are functioning properly after dividing, and to prevent mutations from occurring.

=== Mechanism ===
The mechanism is brought about by positive and negative regulators, and has specific checkpoints to signal cell cycle to stop. The cell cycle goes on only when a go-ahead signal was received by the checkpoints, meaning the stages of cell cycle are operating as usual.

Cyclins and cyclin-dependent kinases (CDK) are major positive regulators, and appear throughout the cell cycle. The CDK appear as positive regulators, which withdraws cells from their cycle if a certain type of cyclin is not detected in the process of cell division. Throughout the cell cycle, three cyclins, namely G1/S, S and M, would appear at different stages of the cell cycle respectively. The CDK detects the presence of these cyclins by binding with these cyclins and producing a type of target protein to move the cell cycle forward. Once the cyclins are absent, it means the previous process in cell cycle is not finished yet, and hence the cell cycle comes to a halt until the whole process is made. The detection of G1/S, S and M cyclins takes place in G1 phase, at the end of G1 phase, and at the end of G2 phase respectively.

There are two main types of negative regulators in the cell cycle that arrests the cell cycle, and has to be removed in order to resume the process. The first one is retinoblastoma protein, which prevents the cell from getting too large and to prohibit the premature transition from G1 to S phase. It functions by binding to transcription factors, for example E2F, so that the DNA could not be replicated until the cell has grown to a certain extent and the retinoblastoma protein is phosphorylated. Another type of negative regulator is p53, which halts the cell cycle process upon detection of DNA damage so as to provide to for repairing. This regulator can also induce apoptosis when the DNA damage is too large and cannot be repaired.

Checkpoints in cell cycles include DNA replication checkpoints and spindle assembly checkpoints. DNA replication checkpoints are located at the G1, S and G2 phase to check if DNA is normal, and withdraws the cell from the cycle if the DNA is damaged or has undergone incomplete replication. The spindle assembly checkpoints, on the other hand, ensure that the chromosomes in cells are segregated properly by microtubules in cells during mitotic cell division. If errors occur when the microtubules are attaching to the centromere, the centre of a chromosome, the cell cycle will halt until the error is corrected. Possible errors include microtubules not attached properly to the centromere, or chromosomes are not segregated in half.

=== Significance ===
The significance of cell cycle arrest is merely to ensure that cells do not undergo improper division. Once such a division occurs, the cell cycle automatically stops until repairs have been made, or directly proceed to the stage of apoptosis once the damage is irreparable. Like permanent cell cycle withdrawal, this mechanism is to prevent damaged cells from continuing to develop or even worse, dividing and spreading.
