= CHEK1 =

Protein-coding gene in humans

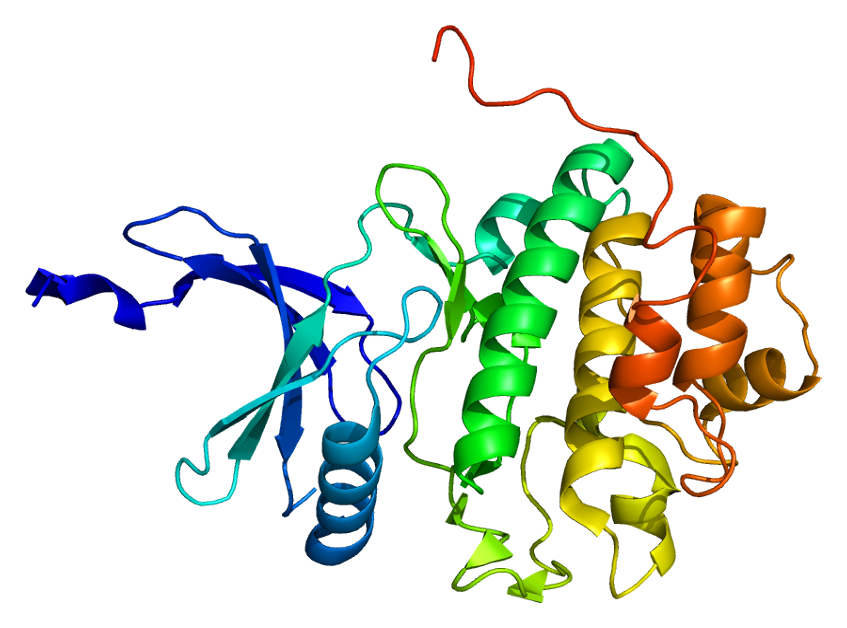
Available structures
PDB	Ortholog search: PDBe RCSB
PDB	List of PDB id codes 1IA8, 1NVQ, 1NVR, 1NVS, 1ZLT, 1ZYS, 2AYP, 2BR1, 2BRB, 2BRG, 2BRH, 2BRM, 2BRN, 2BRO, 2C3J, 2C3K, 2C3L, 2CGU, 2CGV, 2CGW, 2CGX, 2E9N, 2E9O, 2E9P, 2E9U, 2E9V, 2GDO, 2GHG, 2HOG, 2HXL, 2HXQ, 2HY0, 2QHM, 2QHN, 2R0U, 2WMQ, 2WMR, 2WMS, 2WMT, 2WMU, 2WMV, 2WMW, 2WMX, 2X8D, 2X8E, 2X8I, 2XEY, 2XEZ, 2XF0, 2YDI, 2YDJ, 2YDK, 2YER, 2YEX, 2YM3, 2YM4, 2YM5, 2YM6, 2YM7, 2YM8, 2YWP, 3F9N, 3JVR, 3JVS, 3NLB, 3OT3, 3OT8, 3PA3, 3PA4, 3PA5, 3TKH, 3TKI, 3U9N, 4FSM, 4FSN, 4FSQ, 4FSR, 4FST, 4FSU, 4FSW, 4FSY, 4FSZ, 4FT0, 4FT3, 4FT5, 4FT7, 4FT9, 4FTA, 4FTC, 4FTI, 4FTJ, 4FTK, 4FTL, 4FTM, 4FTN, 4FTO, 4FTQ, 4FTR, 4FTT, 4FTU, 4GH2, 4HYH, 4HYI, 4JIK, 4QYE, 4QYF, 4QYG, 4QYH, 4RVK, 4RVL, 4RVM, 5DLS, 5F4N

Identifiers
- Aliases: CHEK1, CHK1, checkpoint kinase 1
- External IDs: OMIM: 603078; MGI: 1202065; HomoloGene: 975; GeneCards: CHEK1; OMA:CHEK1 - orthologs

Gene location (Human)
Chr.	Chromosome 11 (human)
Band	11q24.2	Start	125,625,163 bp
Band	11q24.2	End	125,676,255 bp

Gene location (Mouse)
Chr.	Chromosome 9 (mouse)
Band	9|9 A4	Start	36,619,778 bp
Band	9|9 A4	End	36,638,361 bp
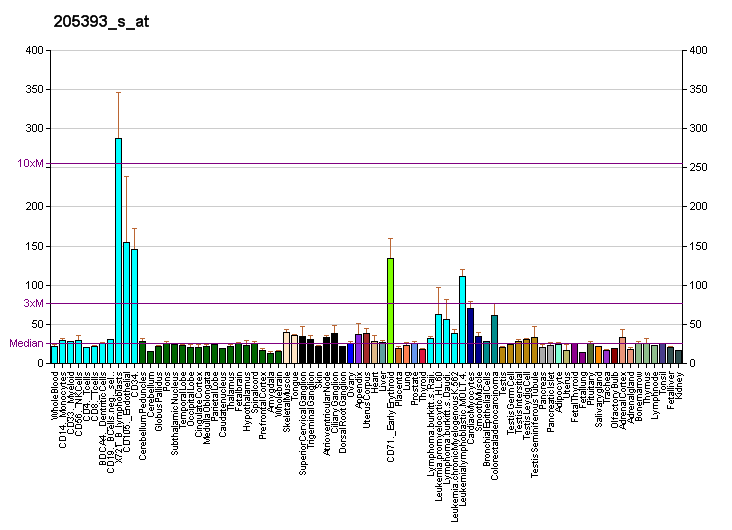

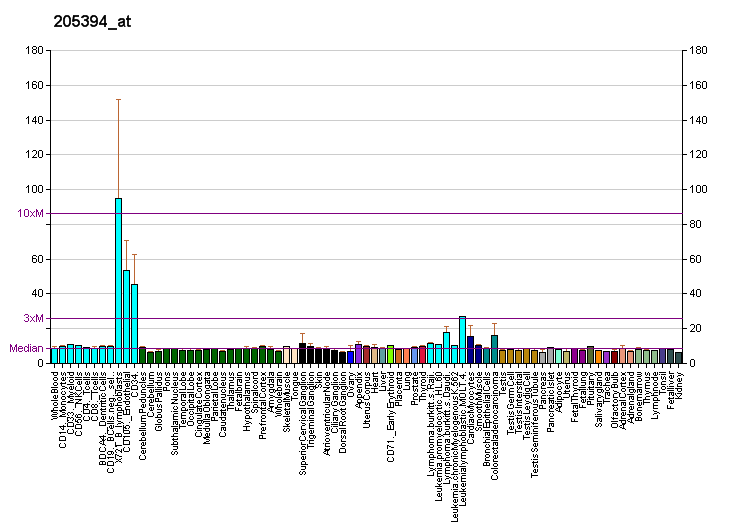
RNA expression pattern
Bgee	Human / Mouse (ortholog); Top expressed in: secondary oocyte; gonad; ventricular zone; ganglionic eminence; buccal mucosa cell; testicle; seminal vesicula; stromal cell of endometrium; rectum; bone marrow / Top expressed in: secondary oocyte; zygote; primary oocyte; ureter; primitive streak; tail of embryo; genital tubercle; ventricular zone; abdominal wall; vas deferens; More reference expression data
BioGPS	More reference expression data
Gene ontology
Molecular function	transferase activity; protein kinase activity; nucleotide binding; protein binding; ATP binding; kinase activity; protein serine/threonine kinase activity; histone kinase activity (H3-T11 specific); protein domain specific binding
Cellular component	cytosol; centrosome; intracellular membrane-bounded organelle; nucleoplasm; microtubule organizing center; condensed nuclear chromosome; telomere; cytoskeleton; nucleus; extracellular space; chromatin; cytoplasm; protein-containing complex
Biological process	regulation of mitotic centrosome separation; regulation of double-strand break repair via homologous recombination; phosphorylation; replicative senescence; cellular response to DNA damage stimulus; DNA replication; protein phosphorylation; cellular response to mechanical stimulus; negative regulation of mitotic nuclear division; DNA damage induced protein phosphorylation; cell cycle; peptidyl-threonine phosphorylation; regulation of signal transduction by p53 class mediator; DNA repair; intracellular signal transduction; regulation of transcription from RNA polymerase II promoter in response to UV-induced DNA damage; regulation of histone H3-K9 acetylation; DNA damage checkpoint signaling; positive regulation of cell cycle; apoptotic process; negative regulation of G0 to G1 transition; mitotic G2 DNA damage checkpoint signaling
Sources:Amigo / QuickGO
Orthologs
Species	Human	Mouse
Entrez	1111	12649
Ensembl	ENSG00000149554	ENSMUSG00000032113
UniProt	O14757	O35280
RefSeq (mRNA)	NM_001114121; NM_001114122; NM_001244846; NM_001274; NM_001330427 NM_001330428	NM_007691
RefSeq (protein)	NP_001107593; NP_001107594; NP_001231775; NP_001265; NP_001317356 NP_001317357	NP_031717
Location (UCSC)	Chr 11: 125.63 – 125.68 Mb	Chr 9: 36.62 – 36.64 Mb
PubMed search
- Wikidata
View/Edit Human	View/Edit Mouse

Checkpoint kinase 1, commonly referred to as Chk1, is a serine/threonine-specific protein kinase that, in humans, is encoded by the CHEK1 gene. Chk1 coordinates the DNA damage response (DDR) and cell cycle checkpoint response. Activation of Chk1 results in the initiation of cell cycle checkpoints, cell cycle arrest, DNA repair and cell death to prevent damaged cells from progressing through the cell cycle.

== Discovery ==
In 1993, Beach and associates initially identified Chk1 as a serine/threonine kinase which regulates the G2/M phase transition in fission yeast. Constitutive expression of Chk1 in fission yeast was shown to induce cell cycle arrest. The same gene called Rad27 was identified in budding yeast by Carr and associates. In 1997, homologs were identified in more complex organisms including the fruit fly, human and mouse. Through these findings, it is apparent Chk1 is highly conserved from yeast to humans.

== Structure ==
Human Chk1 is located on chromosome 11 on the cytogenic band 11q22-23. Chk1 has a N-terminal kinase domain, a linker region, a regulatory SQ/TQ domain and a C-terminal domain. Chk1 contains four Ser/Gln residues. Chk 1 activation occurs primarily through the phosphorylation of the conserved sites, Ser-317, Ser-345 and less often at Ser-366.

== Function ==
Checkpoint kinases (Chks) are protein kinases that are involved in cell cycle control. Two checkpoint kinase subtypes have been identified, Chk1 and Chk2. Chk1 is a central component of genome surveillance pathways and is a key regulator of the cell cycle and cell survival. Chk1 is required for the initiation of DNA damage checkpoints and has recently been shown to play a role in the normal (unperturbed) cell cycle. Chk1 impacts various stages of the cell cycle including the S phase, G2/M transition and M phase.

In addition to mediating cell cycle checkpoints, Chk1 also contributes to DNA repair processes, gene transcription, egg production, embryo development, cellular responses to HIV infection and somatic cell viability.

=== S phase ===
Chk1 is essential for the maintenance of genomic integrity. Chk1 monitors DNA replication in unperturbed cell cycles and responds to genotoxic stress if present. Chk1 recognizes DNA strand instability during replication and can stall DNA replication in order to allow time for DNA repair mechanisms to restore the genome. Recently, Chk1 has shown to mediate DNA repair mechanisms and does so by activating various repair factors. Furthermore, Chk1 has been associated with three particular aspects of the S-phase, which includes the regulation of late origin firing, controlling the elongation process and maintenance of DNA replication fork stability.

=== G2/M transition ===
In response to DNA damage, Chk1 is an important signal transducer for G2/M checkpoint activation. Activation of Chk1 holds the cell in the G2 phase until ready to enter the mitotic phase. This delay allows time for DNA to repair or cell death to occur if DNA damage is irreversible. Chk1 must inactivate in order for the cell to transition from the G2 phase into mitosis, Chk1 expression levels are mediated by regulatory proteins.

=== M phase ===
Chk1 has a regulatory role in the spindle checkpoint however the relationship is less clear as compared to checkpoints in other cell cycle stages. During this phase the Chk1 activating element of ssDNA can not be generated suggesting an alternate form of activation. Studies on Chk1 deficient chicken lymphoma cells have shown increased levels of genomic instability and failure to arrest during the spindle checkpoint phase in mitosis. Furthermore, haploinsufficient mammary epithelial cells illustrated misaligned chromosomes and abnormal segregation. These studies suggest Chk1 depletion can lead to defects in the spindle checkpoint resulting in mitotic abnormalities.

== Interactions ==
DNA damage induces the activation of Chk1 which facilitates the initiation of the DNA damage response (DDR) and cell cycle checkpoints. The DNA damage response is a network of signaling pathways that leads to activation of checkpoints, DNA repair and apoptosis to inhibit damaged cells from progressing through the cell cycle.

=== Chk1 activation ===
Chk1 is regulated by ATR through phosphorylation, forming the ATR-Chk1 pathway. This pathway recognizes single strand DNA (ssDNA) which can be a result of UV-induced damage, replication stress and inter-strand cross linking. Often ssDNA can be a result of abnormal replication during S phase through the uncoupling of replication enzymes helicase and DNA polymerase. These ssDNA structures attract ATR and eventually activates the checkpoint pathway.

However, activation of Chk1 is not solely dependent on ATR, intermediate proteins involved in DNA replication are often necessary. Regulatory proteins such as replication protein A, Claspin, Tim/Tipin, Rad17, TopBP1 may be involved to facilitate Chk1 activation. Additional protein interactions are involved to induce maximal phosphorylation of Chk1. Chk1 activation can also be ATR-independent through interactions with other protein kinases such as PKB/AKT, MAPKAPK and p90/RSK.

Also, Chk1 has been shown to be activated by the Scc1 subunit of the protein cohesin, in zygotes.

=== Cell cycle arrest ===
Chk1 interacts with many downstream effectors to induce cell cycle arrest. In response to DNA damage, Chk1 primarily phosphorylates Cdc25 which results in its proteasomal degradation. The degradation has an inhibitory effect on the formation of cyclin-dependent kinase complexes, which are key drivers of the cell cycle. Through targeting Cdc25, cell cycle arrest can occur at multiple time points including the G1/S transition, S phase and G2/M transition. Furthermore, Chk1 can target Cdc25 indirectly through phosphorylating Nek11.

WEE1 kinase and PLK1 are also targeted by Chk1 to induce cell cycle arrest. Phosphorylation of WEE1 kinase inhibits cdk1 which results in cell cycle arrest at the G2 phase.

Chk1 has a role in the spindle checkpoint during mitosis thus interacts with spindle assembly proteins Aurora A kinase and Aurora B kinase.

=== DNA repair ===
Recently, Chk1 has shown to mediate DNA repair mechanisms and does so by activating repair factors such as proliferating cell nuclear antigen (PCNA), FANCE, Rad51 and TLK. Chk1 facilitates replication fork stabilization during DNA replication and repair however more research is necessary to define the underlying interactions.

== Clinical relevance ==
Chk1 has a central role in coordinating the DNA damage response and therefore is an area of great interest in oncology and the development of cancer therapeutics. Initially Chk1 was thought to function as a tumor suppressor due to the regulatory role it serves amongst cells with DNA damage.

However, there has been no evidence of homozygous loss of function mutants for Chk1 in human tumors. Instead, Chk1 has been shown to be overexpressed in numerous tumors including breast, colon, liver, gastric and nasopharyngeal carcinoma. There is a positive correlation with Chk1 expression and tumor grade and disease recurrence suggesting Chk1 may promote tumor growth. Chk1 is essential for cell survival and through high levels of expressions in tumors the function may be inducing tumor cell proliferation. Further, a study has demonstrated that targeting Chk1 reactivates the tumour suppressive activity of protein phosphtase 2A (PP2A) complex in cancer cells. Studies have shown complete loss of Chk1 suppresses chemically induce carcinogenesis however Chk1 haploinsufficiency results in tumor progression. Due to the possibility of Chk1 involvement in tumor promotion, the kinase and related signaling molecules may be potentially effective therapeutic targets.

Cancer therapies utilize DNA damaging therapies such as chemotherapies and ionizing radiation to inhibit tumor cell proliferation and induce cell cycle arrest. Tumor cells with increased levels of Chk1 acquire survival advantages due to the ability to tolerate a higher level of DNA damage. Therefore, Chk1 may contribute to chemotherapy resistance. In order to optimize chemotherapies, Chk1 must be inhibited to reduce the survival advantage. Chk1 gene can be effectively silenced by siRNA knockdown for further analysis based on an independent validation. By inhibiting Chk1, cancer cells lose the ability to repair damaged DNA which allows chemotherapeutic agents to work more effectively. Combining DNA damaging therapies such as chemotherapy or radiation treatment with Chk1 inhibition enhances targeted cell death and provides synthetic lethality.

Many cancers rely on Chk1 mediated cell cycle arrest heavily, especially if cancers are deficient in p53. Approximately 50% of cancers possess p53 mutations, illustrating the dependence that many cancers may have on the Chk1 pathway. Inhibition of Chk1 allows selective targeting of p53 mutant cells as Chk1 levels are more likely to highly expressed in tumor cells with p53 deficiencies. Even though this method of inhibition is highly targeted, recent research has shown Chk1 also has a role in the normal cell cycle. Therefore, off-target effects and toxicity associated with combination therapies using Chk1 inhibitors must be considered during development of novel therapies.

In a combined computational approach, a set of in-house plant-based semi-synthetic aminoarylbenzosuberene molecules selected for analysis, from these Bch10 regarded as a potential CHK1 inhibitor compared to the top five co-crystallized inhibitors based on their binding affinity and toxicity profile.

== Meiosis ==
During meiosis in human and mouse, CHEK1 protein kinase is important for integrating DNA damage repair with cell cycle arrest. CHEK1 is expressed in the testes and associates with meiotic synaptonemal complexes during the zygonema and pachynema stages. CHEK1 likely acts as an integrator for ATM and ATR signals and may be involved in monitoring meiotic recombination. In mouse oocytes CHEK1 appears to be indispensable for prophase I arrest and to function at the G2/M checkpoint.

== See also ==
- CHEK2
- DNA damage checkpoints
