= Wee1-like protein kinase =

Protein-coding gene in humans

WEE1
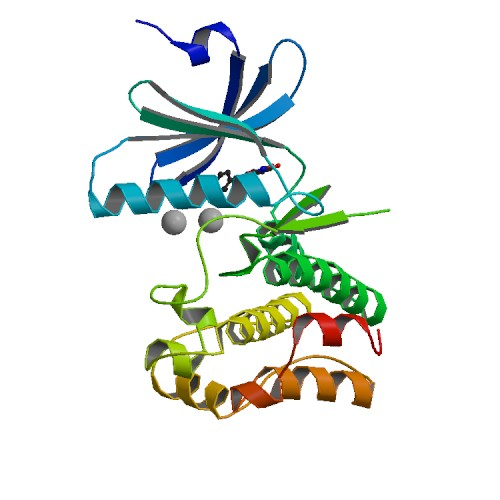

Identifiers
- Aliases: WEE1, WEE1A, WEE1hu, WEE1 G2 checkpoint kinase
- External IDs: OMIM: 193525; MGI: 103075; GeneCards: WEE1
Available structures
PDB	Ortholog search: PDBe RCSB
PDB	List of PDB id codes 1X8B, 2IN6, 2IO6, 2Z2W, 3BI6, 3BIZ, 3CQE, 3CR0
Enzyme activity
EC #	BRENDA	ExPASy	KEGG	MetaCyc
2.7.10.2	↗	↗	↗	↗

Gene location (Human)
Chr.	Chromosome 11 (human)
Band	11p15.4	Start	9,573,670 bp
Band	11p15.4	End	9,593,457 bp

Gene location (Mouse)
Chr.	Chromosome 7 (mouse)
Band	7|7 E3	Start	109,721,253 bp
Band	7|7 E3	End	109,742,493 bp
RNA expression pattern
Bgee	Human / Mouse (ortholog); Top expressed in: ventricular zone; skin of thigh; mucosa of paranasal sinus; tail of epididymis; gastric mucosa; buccal mucosa cell; embryo; ganglionic eminence; bronchial epithelial cell; skin of abdomen / Top expressed in: decidua; gastrula; primitive streak; cumulus cell; parotid gland; endocardial cushion; vas deferens; pontine nuclei; maxillary prominence; mandibular prominence; More reference expression data
BioGPS	n/a
Gene ontology
Molecular function	metal ion binding; nucleotide binding; protein tyrosine kinase activity; protein kinase activity; transferase activity; magnesium ion binding; non-membrane spanning protein tyrosine kinase activity; ATP binding; protein binding; kinase activity
Cellular component	nucleolus; nucleoplasm; cytoplasm; nucleus
Biological process	cell cycle; neuron projection morphogenesis; establishment of cell polarity; cell division; G2/M transition of mitotic cell cycle; microtubule cytoskeleton organization; peptidyl-tyrosine phosphorylation; protein phosphorylation; phosphorylation; mitotic cell cycle; G1/S transition of mitotic cell cycle; negative regulation of G1/S transition of mitotic cell cycle; mitotic cell cycle checkpoint signaling
Sources:Amigo / QuickGO
Orthologs
Databases	NCBI: entry; OMA: entry
Species	Human	Mouse
Entrez	7465	22390
Ensembl	ENSG00000166483	ENSMUSG00000031016
UniProt	P30291	P47810
RefSeq (mRNA)	NM_001143976; NM_003390	NM_009516; NM_001355058
RefSeq (protein)	NP_001137448; NP_003381	NP_033542; NP_001341987
Location (UCSC)	Chr 11: 9.57 – 9.59 Mb	Chr 7: 109.72 – 109.74 Mb
PubMed search
- Wikidata
View/Edit Human	View/Edit Mouse

Wee1-like protein kinase, also known as WEE1, is a protein which in humans is encoded by the WEE1 gene.

== Function ==
This gene encodes a nuclear protein, which is a tyrosine kinase belonging to the Ser/Thr family of protein kinases. This protein catalyzes the inhibitory tyrosine phosphorylation of CDC2/cyclin B kinase, and appears to coordinate the transition between DNA replication and mitosis by protecting the nucleus from cytoplasmically activated CDC2 kinase.

== Interactions ==
Wee1-like protein kinase has been shown to interact with YWHAB and PIN1.
