= CDC25C =

Protein-coding gene in humans

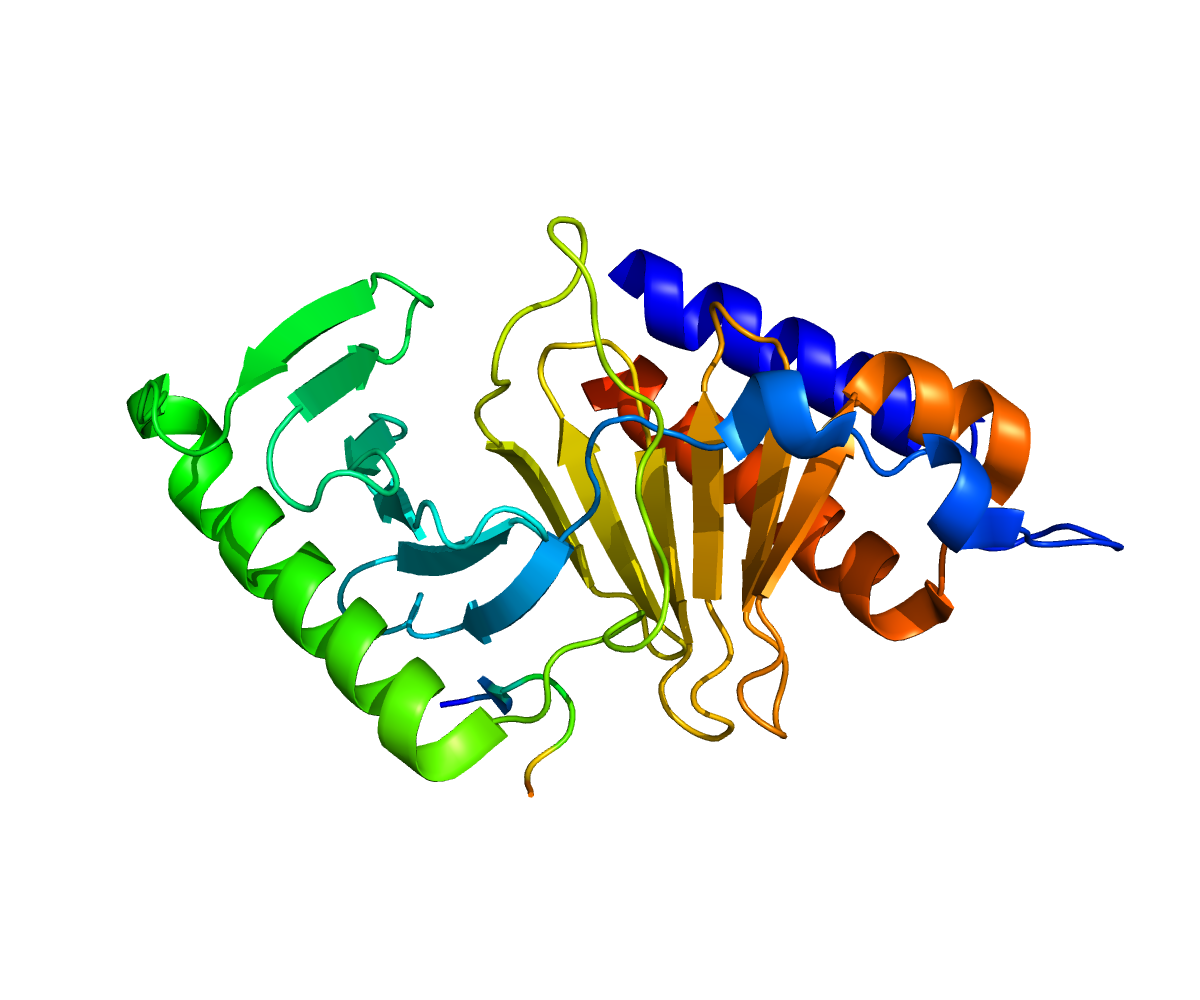

Identifiers
- Aliases: CDC25C, CDC25, PPP1R60, cell division cycle 25C
- External IDs: OMIM: 157680; MGI: 88350; GeneCards: CDC25C
Available structures
PDB	Ortholog search: PDBe RCSB
PDB	List of PDB id codes 2OJX, 3BZI, 3OP3
Enzyme activity
EC #	BRENDA	ExPASy	KEGG	MetaCyc
3.1.3.48	↗	↗	↗	↗

Gene location (Human)
Chr.	Chromosome 5 (human)
Band	5q31.2	Start	138,285,265 bp
Band	5q31.2	End	138,338,355 bp

Gene location (Mouse)
Chr.	Chromosome 18 (mouse)
Band	18 B1|18 18.71 cM	Start	34,866,046 bp
Band	18 B1|18 18.71 cM	End	34,884,586 bp
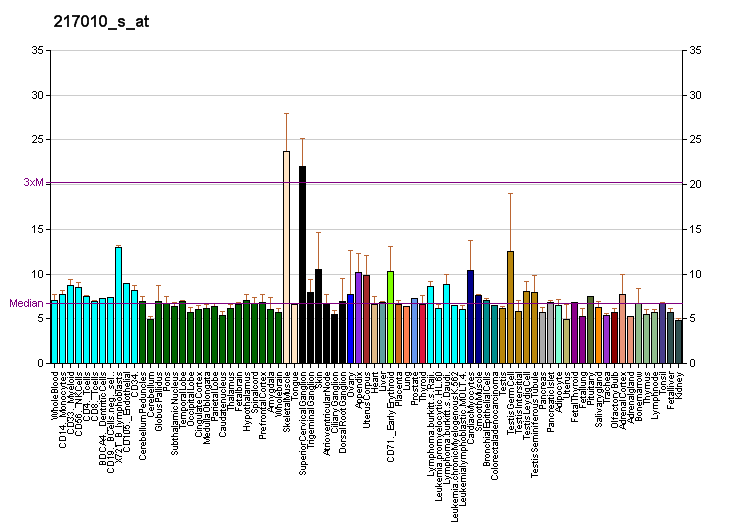

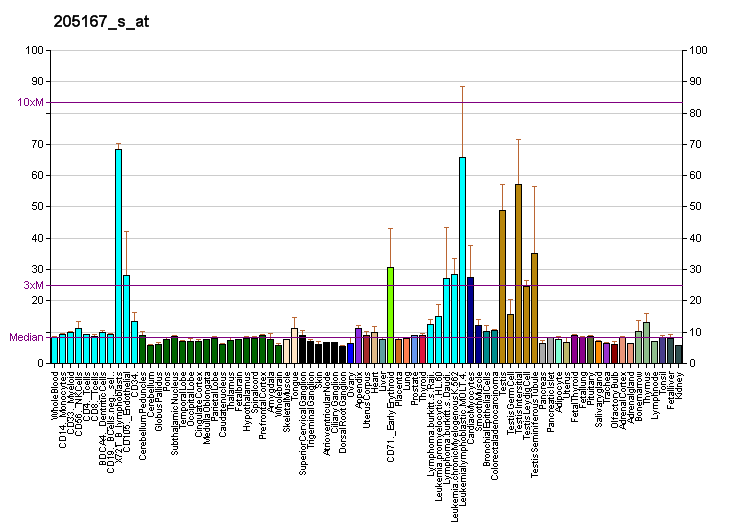
RNA expression pattern
Bgee	Human / Mouse (ortholog); Top expressed in: gonad; ventricular zone; oocyte; testicle; secondary oocyte; left testis; ganglionic eminence; right testis; sperm; mucosa of transverse colon / Top expressed in: membrana granulosa of ovarian follicle; ventricular zone; condyle; genital tubercle; fossa; tail of embryo; spermatid; primitive streak; epiblast; maxillary prominence; More reference expression data
BioGPS	More reference expression data
Gene ontology
Molecular function	protein binding; WW domain binding; protein tyrosine phosphatase activity; hydrolase activity; protein kinase binding; phosphoprotein phosphatase activity
Cellular component	cytoplasm; cytosol; intracellular anatomical structure; nucleoplasm; perinuclear region of cytoplasm; nucleus; nuclear speck
Biological process	regulation of cyclin-dependent protein serine/threonine kinase activity; protein dephosphorylation; regulation of cell cycle; cell division; DNA replication; G2/M transition of mitotic cell cycle; spermatogenesis; cell cycle; cell population proliferation; viral process; regulation of mitotic nuclear division; peptidyl-tyrosine dephosphorylation; DNA damage response, signal transduction by p53 class mediator resulting in cell cycle arrest; positive regulation of cell cycle G2/M phase transition; positive regulation of G2/M transition of mitotic cell cycle; positive regulation of mitotic cell cycle; positive regulation of G2/MI transition of meiotic cell cycle
Sources:Amigo / QuickGO
Orthologs
Databases	NCBI: entry; OMA: entry
Species	Human	Mouse
Entrez	995	12532
Ensembl	ENSG00000158402	ENSMUSG00000044201
UniProt	P30307	P48967
RefSeq (mRNA)	NM_001287582; NM_001287583; NM_001790; NM_022809; NM_001318098 NM_001364026; NM_001364027; NM_001364028	NM_009860
RefSeq (protein)	NP_001274511; NP_001274512; NP_001305027; NP_001781; NP_073720 NP_001350955; NP_001350956; NP_001350957	NP_033990
Location (UCSC)	Chr 5: 138.29 – 138.34 Mb	Chr 18: 34.87 – 34.88 Mb
PubMed search
- Wikidata
View/Edit Human	View/Edit Mouse

M-phase inducer phosphatase 3 is an enzyme that in humans is encoded by the CDC25C gene.

This gene is highly conserved during evolution and it plays a key role in the regulation of cell division. The encoded protein is a tyrosine phosphatase and belongs to the Cdc25 phosphatase family. It directs dephosphorylation of cyclin B-bound CDC2 (CDK1) and triggers entry into mitosis. It is also thought to suppress p53-induced growth arrest. Multiple alternatively spliced transcript variants of this gene have been described, however, the full-length nature of many of them is not known.

== Interactions ==
CDC25C has been shown to interact with MAPK14, CHEK1, PCNA, PIN1, PLK3 and NEDD4.

== See also ==
- Cdc25
