= Cyclin-dependent kinase 1 =

Mammalian protein found in Homo sapiens

CDK1
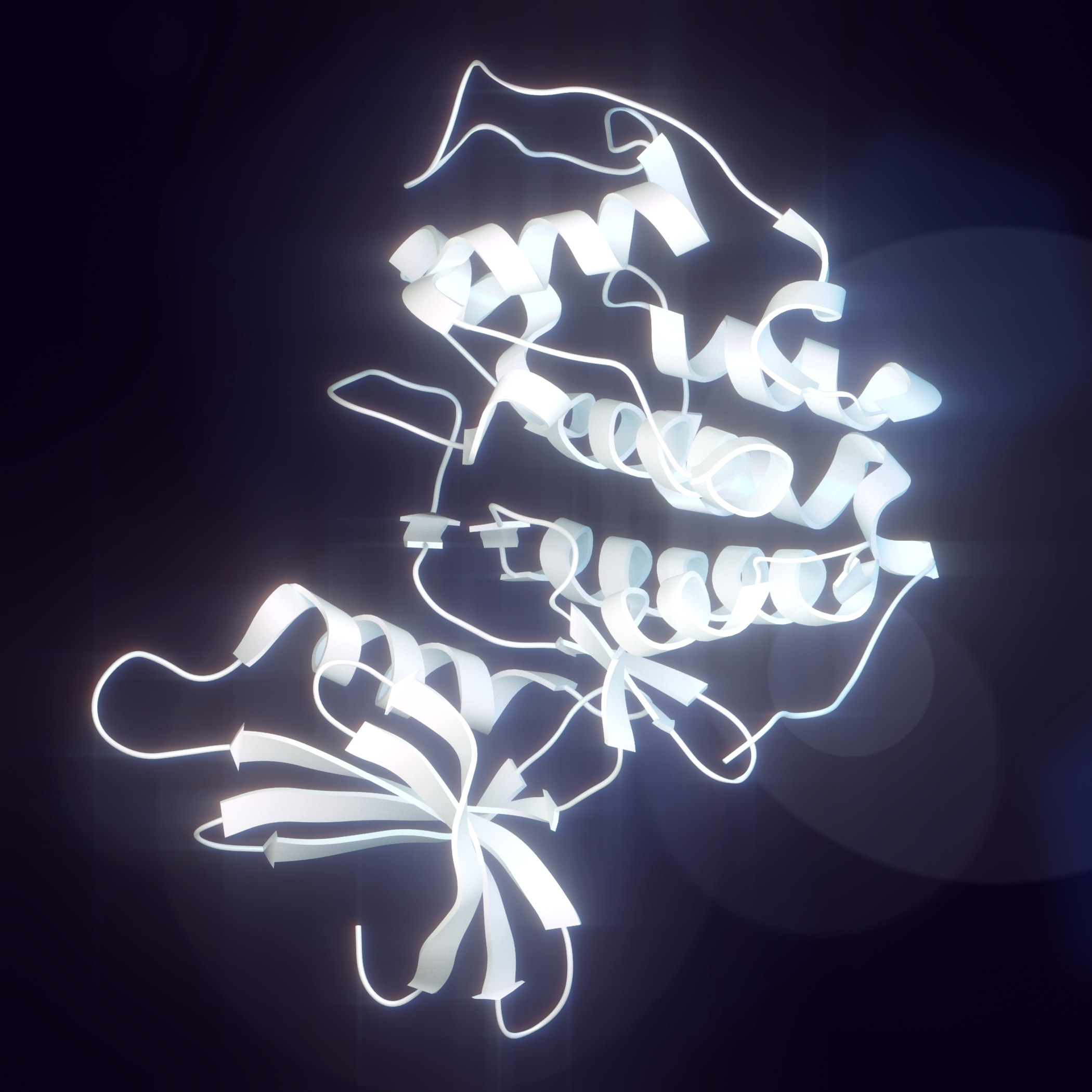

Identifiers
- Aliases: CDK1, CDC2, CDC28A, P34CDC2, cyclin-dependent kinase 1, cyclin dependent kinase 1
- External IDs: OMIM: 116940; MGI: 88351; GeneCards: CDK1
Available structures
PDB	Ortholog search: PDBe RCSB
PDB	List of PDB id codes 4YC6, 4Y72, 5HQ0, 4YC3
Enzyme activity
EC #	BRENDA	ExPASy	KEGG	MetaCyc
2.7.11.22	↗	↗	↗	↗
2.7.11.23	↗	↗	↗	↗

Gene location (Human)
Chr.	Chromosome 10 (human)
Band	10q21.2	Start	60,778,331 bp
Band	10q21.2	End	60,794,852 bp

Gene location (Mouse)
Chr.	Chromosome 10 (mouse)
Band	10 B5.3|10 36.07 cM	Start	69,170,976 bp
Band	10 B5.3|10 36.07 cM	End	69,188,768 bp
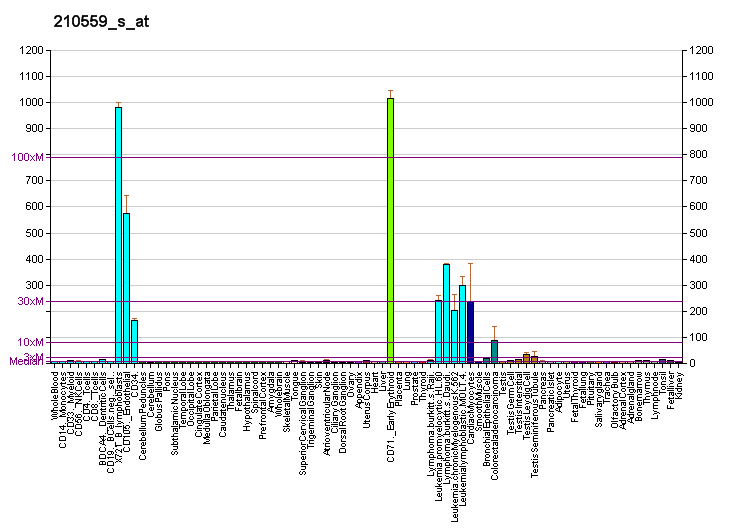

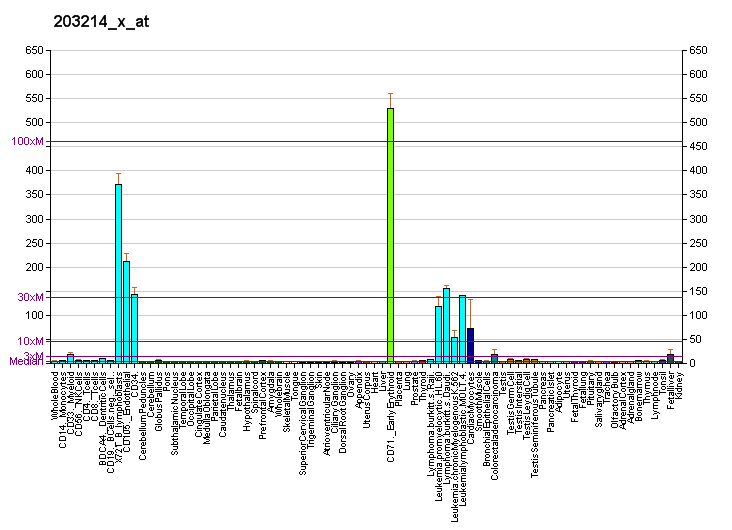

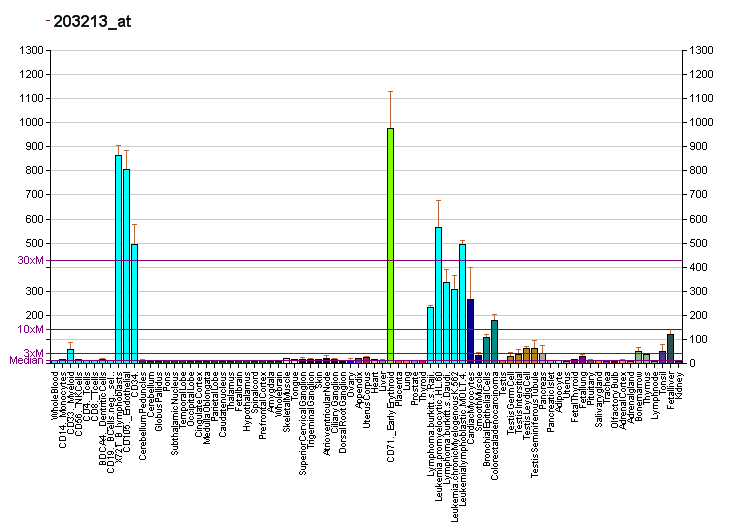
RNA expression pattern
Bgee	Human / Mouse (ortholog); Top expressed in: ventricular zone; ganglionic eminence; trabecular bone; secondary oocyte; gonad; rectum; bone marrow; tibia; appendix; cartilage tissue / Top expressed in: maxillary prominence; mandibular prominence; morula; morula; ventricular zone; fetal liver hematopoietic progenitor cell; epiblast; medial ganglionic eminence; abdominal wall; somite; More reference expression data
BioGPS	More reference expression data
Gene ontology
Molecular function	transferase activity; nucleotide binding; protein kinase activity; histone kinase activity; kinase activity; Hsp70 protein binding; protein binding; RNA polymerase II CTD heptapeptide repeat kinase activity; ATP binding; protein serine/threonine kinase activity; chromatin binding; cyclin binding; cyclin-dependent protein kinase activity; cyclin-dependent protein serine/threonine kinase activity; virus receptor activity
Cellular component	centrosome; membrane; spindle; nucleoplasm; microtubule organizing center; midbody; spindle microtubule; mitochondrion; mitotic spindle; extracellular exosome; cytoskeleton; nucleus; cyclin-dependent protein kinase holoenzyme complex; cytoplasm; cytosol; mitochondrial matrix; endoplasmic reticulum membrane; cyclin B1-CDK1 complex
Biological process	positive regulation of protein localization to nucleus; centrosome cycle; regulation of embryonic development; response to cadmium ion; epithelial cell differentiation; response to organic cyclic compound; phosphorylation; response to copper ion; positive regulation of mitotic cell cycle; negative regulation of apoptotic process; pronuclear fusion; response to activity; regulation of Schwann cell differentiation; cell division; positive regulation of DNA replication; DNA replication; mitotic nuclear membrane disassembly; positive regulation of gene expression; positive regulation of cardiac muscle cell proliferation; chromosome condensation; G2/M transition of mitotic cell cycle; response to axon injury; peptidyl-serine phosphorylation; animal organ regeneration; response to organonitrogen compound; response to amine; DNA repair; cell cycle; anaphase-promoting complex-dependent catabolic process; microtubule cytoskeleton organization; response to ethanol; mitotic G2 DNA damage checkpoint signaling; Golgi disassembly; peptidyl-threonine phosphorylation; cell migration; ventricular cardiac muscle cell development; response to toxic substance; response to hydrogen peroxide; cellular response to hydrogen peroxide; protein localization to kinetochore; apoptotic process; cell population proliferation; proteasome-mediated ubiquitin-dependent protein catabolic process; mitotic cell cycle; DNA damage response, signal transduction by p53 class mediator resulting in cell cycle arrest; regulation of gene expression; regulation of meiotic cell cycle; ciliary basal body-plasma membrane docking; protein phosphorylation; positive regulation of G2/M transition of mitotic cell cycle; protein deubiquitination; mitotic cell cycle phase transition; positive regulation of mitochondrial ATP synthesis coupled electron transport; viral entry into host cell; regulation of G2/M transition of mitotic cell cycle; transcription initiation from RNA polymerase II promoter; protein-containing complex assembly; regulation of mitotic cell cycle phase transition; regulation of circadian rhythm
Sources:Amigo / QuickGO
Orthologs
Databases	NCBI: entry; OMA: entry
Species	Human	Mouse
Entrez	983	12534
Ensembl	ENSG00000170312	ENSMUSG00000019942
UniProt	P06493	P11440
RefSeq (mRNA)	NM_001130829; NM_001170406; NM_001170407; NM_001786; NM_033379 NM_001320918	NM_007659
RefSeq (protein)	NP_001163877; NP_001163878; NP_001307847; NP_001777; NP_203698	NP_031685
Location (UCSC)	Chr 10: 60.78 – 60.79 Mb	Chr 10: 69.17 – 69.19 Mb
PubMed search
- Wikidata
View/Edit Human	View/Edit Mouse

Cyclin-dependent kinase 1 also known as CDK1 or cell division cycle protein 2 homolog is a highly conserved protein that functions as a serine/threonine protein kinase, and is a key player in cell cycle regulation. It has been highly studied in the budding yeast S. cerevisiae, and the fission yeast S. pombe, where it is encoded by genes cdc28 and cdc2, respectively. With its cyclin partners, Cdk1 forms complexes that phosphorylate a variety of target substrates (over 75 have been identified in budding yeast); phosphorylation of these proteins leads to cell cycle progression.

== Structure ==
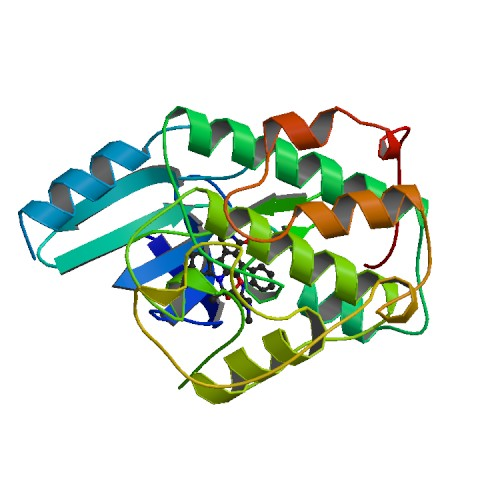
Crystal Structure of the human Cdk1 homolog, Cdk2

Cdk1 is a small protein (approximately 34 kilodaltons), and is highly conserved. The human homolog of Cdk1, CDK1, shares approximately 63% amino-acid identity with its yeast homolog. Furthermore, human CDK1 is capable of rescuing fission yeast carrying a cdc2 mutation. Cdk1 is comprised mostly by the bare protein kinase motif, which other protein kinases share. Cdk1, like other kinases, contains a cleft in which ATP fits. Substrates of Cdk1 bind near the mouth of the cleft, and Cdk1 residues catalyze the covalent bonding of the γ-phosphate to the oxygen of the hydroxyl serine/threonine of the substrate.

In addition to this catalytic core, Cdk1, like other cyclin-dependent kinases, contains a T-loop, which, in the absence of an interacting cyclin, prevents substrate binding to the Cdk1 active site. Cdk1 also contains a PSTAIRE helix, which, upon cyclin binding, moves and rearranges the active site, facilitating Cdk1 kinase activities.

== Function ==
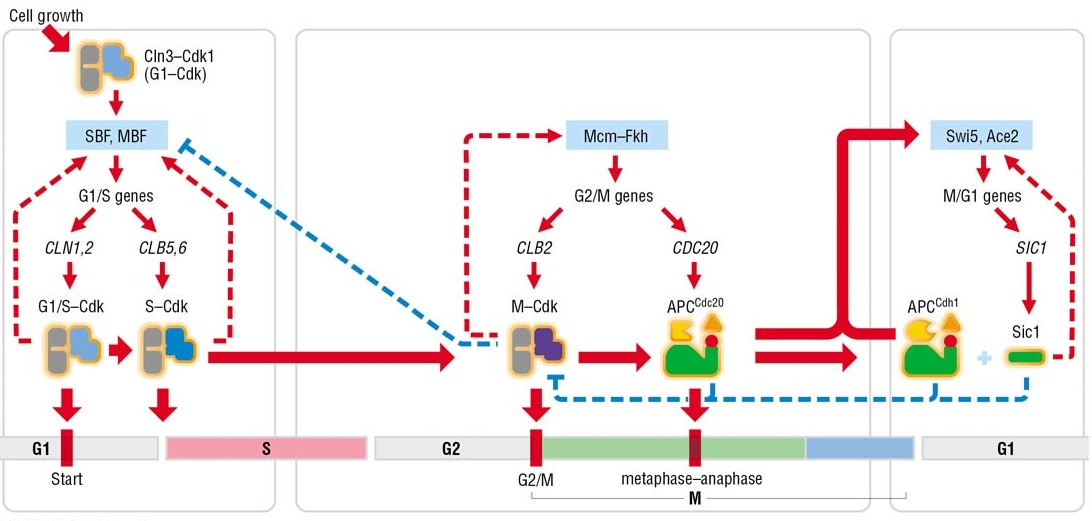
Fig. 1 The diagram shows the role of Cdk1 in progression through the S. cerevisiae cell cycle. Cln3-Cdk1 leads to Cln1,2-Cdk1 activity, eventually resulting in Clb5,6-Cdk1 activity and then Clb1-4-Cdk1 activity.

When bound to its cyclin partners, Cdk1 phosphorylation leads to cell cycle progression. Cdk1 activity is best understood in S. cerevisiae, so Cdk1 S. cerevisiae activity is described here.

In the budding yeast, initial cell cycle entry is controlled by two regulatory complexes, SBF (SCB-binding factor) and MBF (MCB-binding factor). These two complexes control G_{1}/S gene transcription; however, they are normally inactive. SBF is inhibited by the protein Whi5; however, when phosphorylated by Cln3-Cdk1, Whi5 is ejected from the nucleus, allowing for transcription of the G_{1}/S regulon, which includes the G_{1}/S cyclins Cln1,2. G_{1}/S cyclin-Cdk1 activity leads to preparation for S phase entry (e.g., duplication of centromeres or the spindle pole body), and a rise in the S cyclins (Clb5,6 in S. cerevisiae). Clb5,6-Cdk1 complexes directly lead to replication origin initiation; however, they are inhibited by Sic1, preventing premature S phase initiation.

Cln1,2 and/or Clb5,6-Cdk1 complex activity leads to a sudden drop in Sic1 levels, allowing for coherent S phase entry. Finally, phosphorylation by M cyclins (e.g., Clb1, 2, 3 and 4) in complex with Cdk1 leads to spindle assembly and sister chromatid alignment. Cdk1 phosphorylation also leads to the activation of the ubiquitin-protein ligase APC^{Cdc20}, an activation which allows for chromatid segregation and, furthermore, degradation of M-phase cyclins. This destruction of M cyclins leads to the final events of mitosis (e.g., spindle disassembly, mitotic exit).

== Regulation ==
Given its essential role in cell cycle progression, Cdk1 is highly regulated. Most obviously, Cdk1 is regulated by its binding with its cyclin partners. Cyclin binding alters access to the active site of Cdk1, allowing for Cdk1 activity; furthermore, cyclins impart specificity to Cdk1 activity. At least some cyclins contain a hydrophobic patch which may directly interact with substrates, conferring target specificity. Furthermore, cyclins can target Cdk1 to particular subcellular locations.

In addition to regulation by cyclins, Cdk1 is regulated by phosphorylation. A conserved tyrosine (Tyr15 in humans) leads to inhibition of Cdk1; this phosphorylation is thought to alter ATP orientation, preventing efficient kinase activity. In S. pombe, for example, incomplete DNA synthesis may lead to stabilization of this phosphorylation, preventing mitotic progression.

Wee1, conserved among all eukaryotes, phosphorylates Tyr15, whereas members of the Cdc25 family are phosphatases, counteracting this activity. The balance between the two is thought to help govern cell cycle progression. Wee1 is controlled upstream by Cdr1, Cdr2, and Pom1.

Cdk1-cyclin complexes are also governed by direct binding of Cdk inhibitor proteins (CKIs). One such protein, already discussed, is Sic1. Sic1 is a stoichiometric inhibitor that binds directly to Clb5,6-Cdk1 complexes. Multisite phosphorylation, by Cdk1-Cln1/2, of Sic1 is thought to time Sic1 ubiquitination and destruction, and by extension, the timing of S-phase entry. Only until Sic1 inhibition is overcome can Clb5,6 activity occur and S phase initiation may begin.

== Interactions ==
Cdk1 has been shown to interact with:

- BCL2,
- CCNB1,
- CCNE1,
- CDKN3
- DAB2,
- FANCC,
- GADD45A,
- LATS1,
- LYN,
- P53, and
- UBC.

== See also ==
- E2F#E2F.2FpRb complexes
- Hyperphosphorylation
- cdc25
- Maturation promoting factor
- CDK
- cyclin A
- cyclin B
- cyclin D
- cyclin E
- Wee (cell cycle)
