= Cdc25 =

Enzyme

M-phase inducer phosphatase

Identifiers
- Aliases: Cdc25 phosphatase
- External IDs: OMIM: 157680; GeneCards: ; OMA:- orthologs
Orthologs
Species	Human	Mouse
Entrez	n/a	n/a
Ensembl	n/a	n/a
UniProt	n a	n/a
RefSeq (mRNA)	n/a	n/a
RefSeq (protein)	n/a	n/a
Location (UCSC)	n/a	n/a
PubMed search	n/a	n/a
- Wikidata
View/Edit Human

Cdc25 is a dual-specificity phosphatase first isolated from the yeast Schizosaccharomyces pombe as a cell cycle defective mutant. As with other cell cycle proteins or genes such as Cdc2 and Cdc4, the "cdc" in its name refers to "cell division cycle". Dual-specificity phosphatases are considered a sub-class of protein tyrosine phosphatases. By removing inhibitory phosphate residues from target cyclin-dependent kinases (Cdks), Cdc25 proteins control entry into and progression through various phases of the cell cycle, including mitosis and S ("Synthesis") phase.

== Function in activating Cdk1 ==
Cdc25 activates cyclin dependent kinases by removing phosphate from residues in the Cdk active site. In turn, the phosphorylation by M-Cdk (a complex of Cdk1 and cyclin B) activates Cdc25. Together with Wee1, M-Cdk activation is switch-like. The switch-like behavior forces entry into mitosis to be quick and irreversible. Cdk activity can be reactivated after dephosphorylation by Cdc25. The Cdc25 enzymes Cdc25A-C are known to control the transitions from G1 to S phase and G2 to M phase.

== Structure ==
The structure of Cdc25 proteins can be divided into two main regions: the N-terminal region, which is highly divergent and contains sites for its phosphorylation and ubiquitination, which regulate the phosphatase activity; and the C-terminal region, which is highly homologous and contains the catalytic site.

== Evolution and species distribution ==
Cdc25 enzymes are well conserved through evolution, and have been isolated from fungi such as yeasts as well as all metazoans examined to date, including humans. The exception among eukaryotes may be plants, as the purported plant Cdc25s have characteristics, (such as the use of cations for catalysis), that are more akin to serine/threonine phosphatases than dual-specificity phosphatases, raising doubts as to their authenticity as Cdc25 phosphatases. The Cdc25 family appears to have expanded in relation to the complexity of the cell-cycle and life-cycle of higher animals. Yeasts have a single Cdc25 (as well as a distantly related enzyme known as Itsy-bitsy phosphatase 1, or Ibp1). Drosophila melanogaster has two Cdc25s, known as string and twine, which control mitosis and meiosis, respectively. Most other model organisms examined have three Cdc25s, designated Cdc25A, Cdc25B, and Cdc25C. An exception is the nematode Caenorhabditis elegans, which has four distinct Cdc25 genes (Cdc-25.1 to Cdc-25.4).

== Knockout models ==
Although the highly conserved nature of the Cdc25s implies an important role in cell physiology, Cdc25B and Cdc25C knockout mice (both single and double mutants) are viable and display no major alterations in their cell cycles, suggesting some functional compensation either via other Cdk regulatory enzymes (such as Wee1 and Myt1) or from the activity of the third member of the family, Cdc25A. Hiroaki Kiyokawa's laboratory has shown that Cdc25A knockout mice are not viable.

== In human disease ==
The Cdc25s, and in particular Cdc25A and Cdc25B, are proto-oncogenes in humans and have been shown to be overexpressed in a number of cancers. The central role of Cdc25s in the cell cycle has garnered them considerable attention from the pharmaceutical industry as potential targets for novel chemotherapeutic (anti-cancer) agents. To date, no clinically viable compounds targeting these enzymes have been described.

A large number of potent small-molecule Cdc25 Inhibitors have been identified that bind to the active site and belong to various chemical classes, including natural products, lipophilic acids, quinonoids, electrophiles, sulfonylated aminothiazoles and phosphate bioisosteres. Although some progress has been made in developing potent and selective inhibitors for Cdc25 family of proteins, there is scope for development of novel therapeutic strategies to target them. A new class of peptide-derived inhibitors, based on sequence homology with the protein substrate, can be developed. It is challenging to use these compounds as drugs due to their lack of suitable ADME properties.

== See also ==
- Cyclin
