= Gilbert Smithson Adair =

British biochemist (1896–1979)

- Born: 21 September 1896; Whitehaven, England
- Died: 22 June 1979 (aged 82); Cambridge, England
- Resting place: Cambridge Crematorium
- Education: King's College, Cambridge
- Known for: Proving that haemoglobin is a tetramer
- Spouse: Muriel Elaine Robinson
- Scientific career
- Fields: Proteins

Gilbert Smithson Adair FRS (21 September 1896 – 22 June 1979) was an early protein scientist who used osmotic pressure measurements to establish that haemoglobin was a tetramer under physiological conditions. This conclusion led him to be the first to identify cooperative binding, in the absolute context of oxygen binding to haemoglobin.

Gilbert Smithson Adair was born on 21 September 1896 in Whitehaven, son of Harold and Anna Mary Adair (née Jackson), who were Quakers. Gilbert and his sister Anna were initially taught at home by a governess. Later, Gilbert was taught at the Quaker Bootham School, where he was a boarder. The family, meanwhile had moved to Egremont, where Harold Adair was managing director of Wyndham Mining Company Ltd. an iron ore mine. Adair entered King's College, Cambridge from 1915 to 1917, gaining a first in Natural Sciences. He was soon employed by the Food Investigation Board, a wartime research group set up by the DSIR to determine how to prevent wastage of food, particularly fish, meat, fruits, etc. on cargo ships.

In 1920, he became a research student at King's College, and was made an official Fellow in 1928, granting him five years to devote to research. In 1931, he became assistant director of the Physiological Laboratory in Cambridge. He was a Reader in Biophysics from 1945 until his retirement in 1963. Adair was made a Fellow of the Royal Society in 1939.

He married Muriel Elaine Robinson in Cambridge in 1931. Muriel had entered Girton College in 1918, and went on to obtain a research fellowship at Newnham. She died on 2 January 1975.

As an incidental historical note, Adair provided the purified haemoglobin that Max Perutz used for the first structure determination of any protein (by X-ray crystallography).

Gilbert Smithson Adair died in Cambridge on 22 June 1979.

== Adair equation ==
The equation

$y = \frac {\frac{a}{K_1} + \frac{3a^2}{K_1K_2} + \frac{3a^3}{K_1K_2K_3} + \frac{a^4}{K_1K_2K_3K_4}} {1 + \frac{4a}{K_1} + \frac{6a^2}{K_1K_2} + \frac{4a^3}{K_1K_2K_3} + \frac{a^4}{K_1K_2K_3K_4}}$

is called the Adair equation for four binding sites. (Analogous equations can be written for other numbers of sites.) It expresses the degree of saturation at equilibrium $y$ as a function of ligand concentration $a$ and a series of dissociation constants $K_1$, $K_2$, $K_3$, $K_4$ of the binding sites, assuming no interaction between them. All equations for models of cooperativity of binding at equilibrium are special cases of the Adair equation, even if they look superficially as if they are not.
