= Goldbeter–Koshland kinetics =

Steady-state solution for a 2-state biological system

A kinase Y and a phosphatase X that act on a protein Z; one possible application for the Goldbeter–Koshland kinetics

The Goldbeter–Koshland kinetics describe a steady-state solution for a 2-state biological system. In this system, the interconversion between these two states is performed by two enzymes with opposing effect. One example would be a protein Z that exists in a phosphorylated form Z_{P} and in an unphosphorylated form Z; the corresponding kinase Y and phosphatase X interconvert the two forms. In this case we would be interested in the equilibrium concentration of the protein Z (Goldbeter–Koshland kinetics only describe equilibrium properties, thus no dynamics can be modeled). It has many applications in the description of biological systems.

The Goldbeter–Koshland kinetics is described by the Goldbeter–Koshland function:

$$\begin{align}
z = \frac{[Z]}{[Z]_0 } = G(v_1, v_2, J_1, J_2) &= \frac{ 2  v_1 J_2}{B + \sqrt{B^2 - 4 (v_2 - v_1) v_1 J_2}}\\
\end{align}$$

with the constants

$$\begin{align}
v_1 = k_1 [X] ; \
v_2 &= k_2 [Y] ; \
J_1 =  \frac{K_{M1}}{[Z]_0 } ; \
J_2 =  \frac{K_{M2}}{[Z]_0 }; \
B = v_2 - v_1 + J_1 v_2 + J_2 v_1
\end{align}$$

Graphically the function takes values between 0 and 1 and has a sigmoid behavior. The smaller the parameters J_{1} and J_{2} the steeper the function gets and the more of a switch-like behavior is observed. Goldbeter–Koshland kinetics is an example of ultrasensitivity.

== Derivation ==
Since equilibrium properties are searched one can write

$$\begin{align}
\frac{d[Z]}{dt} \ \stackrel{!}{=}\ 0
\end{align}$$

From Michaelis–Menten kinetics the rate at which Z_{P} is dephosphorylated is known to be $r_1 = \frac{k_1 [X] [Z_P]}{K_{M1}+ [Z_P]}$ and the rate at which Z is phosphorylated is $r_2 = \frac{k_2 [Y] [Z]}{K_{M2}+ [Z]}$. Here the K_{M} stand for the Michaelis–Menten constant which describes how well the enzymes X and Y bind and catalyze the conversion whereas the kinetic parameters k_{1} and k_{2} denote the rate constants for the catalyzed reactions. Assuming that the total concentration of Z is constant one can additionally write that [Z]_{0} = [Z_{P}] + [Z] and one thus gets:

$$\begin{align}
\frac{d[Z]}{dt} = r_1 - r_2 = \frac{k_1 [X] ([Z]_0 - [Z])}{K_{M1}+ ([Z]_0 - [Z])} &-\frac{k_2 [Y] [Z]}{K_{M2}+ [Z]} = 0 \\
\frac{k_1 [X] ([Z]_0 - [Z])}{K_{M1}+ ([Z]_0 - [Z])} &= \frac{k_2 [Y] [Z]}{K_{M2}+ [Z]} \\
\frac{k_1 [X] (1- \frac{[Z]}{[Z]_0 })}{\frac{K_{M1}}{[Z]_0 }+ (1 - \frac{[Z]}{[Z]_0 })} &= \frac{k_2 [Y] \frac{[Z]}{[Z]_0 }}{\frac{K_{M2}}{[Z]_0 }+ \frac{[Z]}{[Z]_0 }} \\
\frac{v_1 (1- z)}{J_1+ (1 - z)} &= \frac{v_2  z}{J_2+ z} \qquad \qquad (1)
\end{align}$$

with the constants

$$\begin{align}
z = \frac{[Z]}{[Z]_0 } ; \
v_1 = k_1 [X] ; \
v_2 &= k_2 [Y] ; \
J_1 =  \frac{K_{M1}}{[Z]_0 } ; \
J_2 =  \frac{K_{M2}}{[Z]_0 }; \ \qquad \qquad (2)
\end{align}$$

If we thus solve the quadratic equation (1) for z we get:

$$\begin{align}
\frac{v_1 (1- z)}{J_1+ (1 - z)} &= \frac{v_2  z}{J_2+ z} \\
J_2 v_1+ z v_1 - J_2 v_1 z - z^2 v_1 &= z v_2 J_1+ v_2  z - z^2 v_2\\
z^2 (v_2 - v_1) - z \underbrace{(v_2 - v_1 + J_1 v_2 + J_2 v_1)}_{B} +  v_1 J_2 &= 0\\
z = \frac{B - \sqrt{B^2 - 4 (v_2 - v_1) v_1 J_2}}{2 (v_2 - v_1)} &= \frac{B - \sqrt{B^2 - 4 (v_2 - v_1) v_1 J_2}}{2 (v_2 - v_1)}  \cdot \frac{B + \sqrt{B^2 - 4 (v_2 - v_1) v_1 J_2}}{B + \sqrt{B^2 - 4 (v_2 - v_1) v_1 J_2}}\\
z &= \frac{ 4 (v_2 - v_1) v_1 J_2}{2 (v_2 - v_1)}  \cdot \frac{1}{B + \sqrt{B^2 - 4 (v_2 - v_1) v_1 J_2}}\\
z &= \frac{ 2  v_1 J_2}{B + \sqrt{B^2 - 4 (v_2 - v_1) v_1 J_2}}. \qquad \qquad (3)
\end{align}$$

Thus (3) is a solution to the initial equilibrium problem and describes the equilibrium concentration of [Z] and [Z_{P}] as a function of the kinetic parameters of the phosphorylation and dephosphorylation reaction and the concentrations of the kinase and phosphatase. The solution is the Goldbeter–Koshland function with the constants from (2):

$$\begin{align}
z = \frac{[Z]}{[Z]_0 } = G(v_1, v_2, J_1, J_2) &= \frac{ 2  v_1 J_2}{B + \sqrt{B^2 - 4 (v_2 - v_1) v_1 J_2}}.\\
\end{align}$$

== Ultrasensitivity of Goldbeter–Koshland modules ==
The ultrasensitivity (sigmoidality) of a Goldbeter–Koshland module can be measured by its Hill Coefficient:

$n_{H} = \frac{ \log(81)}{\log(EC90/EC10)}$.

where EC90 and EC10 are the input values needed to produce the 10% and 90% of the maximal response, respectively.

In a living cell, Goldbeter–Koshland modules are embedded in a bigger network with upstream and downstream components. This components may constrain the range of inputs that the module will receive as well as the range of the module's outputs that network will be able to detect. Altszyler et al. (2014) studied how the effective ultrasensitivity of a modular system is affected by these restrictions. They found that Goldbeter–Koshland modules are highly sensitive to dynamic range limitations imposed by downstream components. However, in the case of asymmetric Goldbeter–Koshland modules, a moderate downstream constrain can produce effective sensitivities much larger than that of the original module when considered in isolation.
