= Newcastle University School of Medicine =

UK academic institution

- Type: Public Medical School
- Established: 1834 – School of Medicine and Surgery; 1963 – became independent from the University of Durham
- Affiliations: Newcastle University
- Pro-Vice-Chancellor: Professor David Burn
- Students: 367 per year
- Location: Newcastle upon Tyne, Tyne & Wear, England; 54.9815°N 1.622°W
- Campus: Urban
- Colours: Palatinate
- Website: www.ncl.ac.uk/sme/study/undergraduate/

Newcastle University School of Medicine is the medical school at Newcastle University in England. It was established in 1834 in the city of Newcastle upon Tyne and served as the College of Medicine in connection with Durham University from 1851 to 1870 and then, as a full college of the university, Durham University College of Medicine from 1870 to 1937 when it joined Armstrong College, to form King's College, Durham. In 1963 King's College became the University of Newcastle upon Tyne. The university now uses the name "Newcastle University".

Collegium Medicum Novocastrense - the history of the Medical School, afterwards the Durham College of Medicine at Newcastle-upon-Tyne, for forty years, from 1832 to 1872

== History ==
In 1832 a group of local medics – physicians George Fife (teaching materia medica and therapeutics) and Samuel Knott (teaching theory and practice of medicine), and surgeons John Fife (teaching surgery), Alexander Fraser (teaching anatomy and physiology) and Henry Glassford Potter (teaching chemistry) – started offering medical lectures in Bell's Court to supplement the apprenticeship system (a fourth surgeon, Duncan McAllum, is mentioned by some sources among the founders, but was not included in the prospectus). The first session started on 1 October 1832 with eight or nine students, including John Snow, then apprenticed to a local surgeon-apothecary, the opening lecture being delivered by John Fife. In 1834 the lectures and practical demonstrations moved to the Hall of the Company of Barber Surgeons to accommodate the growing number of students, and the School of Medicine and Surgery was formally established on 1 October 1834.

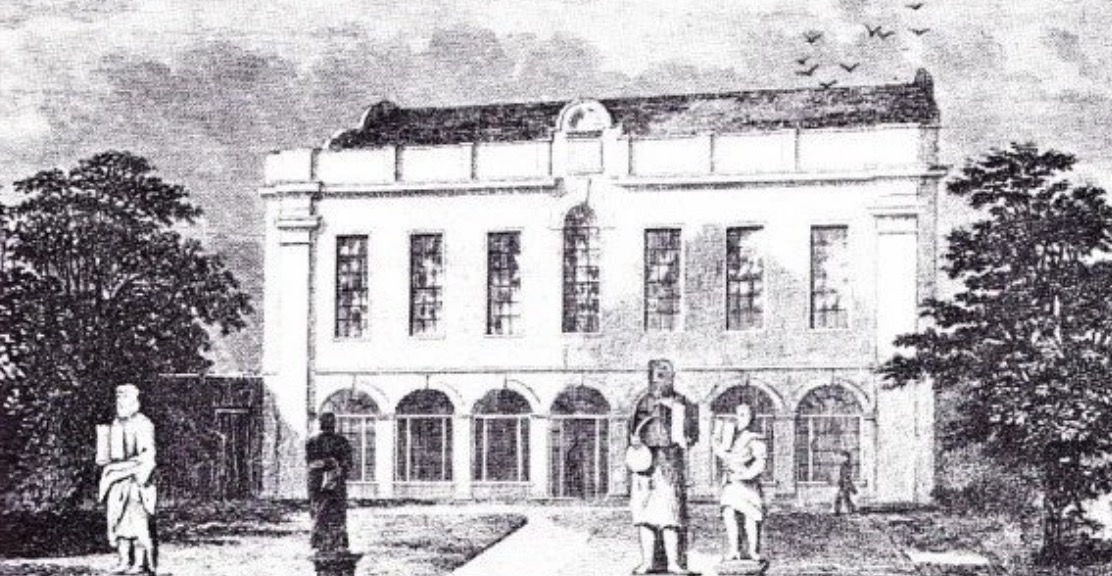
Former Barber Surgeons' Hall, Houston Street, Newcastle

On 25 June 1851, following a dispute among the teaching staff, the school was formally dissolved and the lecturers split into two rival institutions. The majority formed the Newcastle College of Medicine, and the others established themselves as the Newcastle upon Tyne College of Medicine and Practical Science with competing lecture courses. In July 1851 the majority college was recognised by the Society of Apothecaries and in October by the Royal College of Surgeons of England and in January 1852 was approved by the University of London to submit its students for London medical degree examinations. Later in 1852, the majority college was formally linked to the University of Durham, becoming the Newcastle-upon-Tyne College of Medicine in connection with the University of Durham.

The college awarded its first 'Licence in Medicine' (LicMed) under the auspices of the University of Durham in 1856, with external examiners from Oxford and London, becoming the first medical examining body on the United Kingdom to institute practical examinations alongside written and viva voce examinations. The two colleges amalgamated in 1857, with the first session of the unified college opening on 3 October that year.

In 1861 the degree of Master of Surgery was introduced, allowing for the double qualification of Licence of Medicine and Bachelor of Surgery, along with the degrees of Bachelor of Medicine and Doctor of Medicine, both of which required residence in Durham. In 1870 the college was brought into closer connection with the university, becoming the Durham University College of Medicine with the Reader in Medicine becoming the Professor of Medicine, the college gaining a representative on the university's senate, and residence at the college henceforth counting as residence in the university towards degrees in medicine and surgery, removing the need for students to spend a period of residence in Durham before they could receive the higher degrees.

A separate College of Physical Science was founded in Newcastle in 1871. The medical and physical colleges merged to form King's College, Durham under the Durham University Act 1937, and this became the University of Newcastle upon Tyne in 1963.

From 2001, it operated in partnership with Durham University's recreated medical school based at Queen's Campus on Teesside, until 2018 when Durham completed the transfer of its medical school to Newcastle.

== Curriculum ==
The medical school follows a modern, integrated, systems-based curriculum, and was the first medical school in the country to operate an integrated medical curriculum.

Students complete two years of campus-based teaching, followed by three years of largely hospital based teaching. During each of these three years, students are based at an LEP (Local education provider) which roughly corresponds to an NHS Trust. These LEPs can be anywhere within the north east and north Cumbria, however students will spend at least two years in an LEP that is a commutable distance from Newcastle.

The medical school also offers an accelerated medical programme, intended for students who have a previous degree in a different (often unrelated) discipline. This lasts four years, the first year covering the same material as the first two years of the five-year course. Second year "accelerated" students are then taught alongside the third year students from the five-year programme. The medical school offers students the chance to intercalate in a BSc in another area of study after the 2nd year, either at Newcastle University or externally at another university. After, the 4th year, the medical schools also offers students the opportunity to undertake a Master's degree or MRes. Some students complete a PhD following the completion of an intercalated master's degree. After completing the extra year(s), students resume their medical studies.

== Reputation and rankings ==
Newcastle Medical School consistently ranks as one of the top medical schools in the UK due to high levels of teaching and research. It was the first institution in the UK to be given permission to pursue stem-cell research. In 2008, the BMC Medicine journal reported medical graduates from Oxford, Cambridge and Newcastle performed better in postgraduate tests than any other medical school in the UK.

In international rankings, Newcastle Medical School is consistently ranked among the top 100 medical schools worldwide. In the 2015 Leiden Ranking, which measures the scientific research performance of universities based on bibliometric indicators such as citation rates and the proportion of publications in the top 10% worldwide, Newcastle University’s Faculty of Medical Sciences was ranked 44th out of 714 institutions globally, positioning it among the top 50 universities in the world for medicine and biomedical sciences. In the 2022 QS World University Rankings by Subject for Medicine, Newcastle University ranked 64th globally, placing it within the top 10 medical schools in the UK.

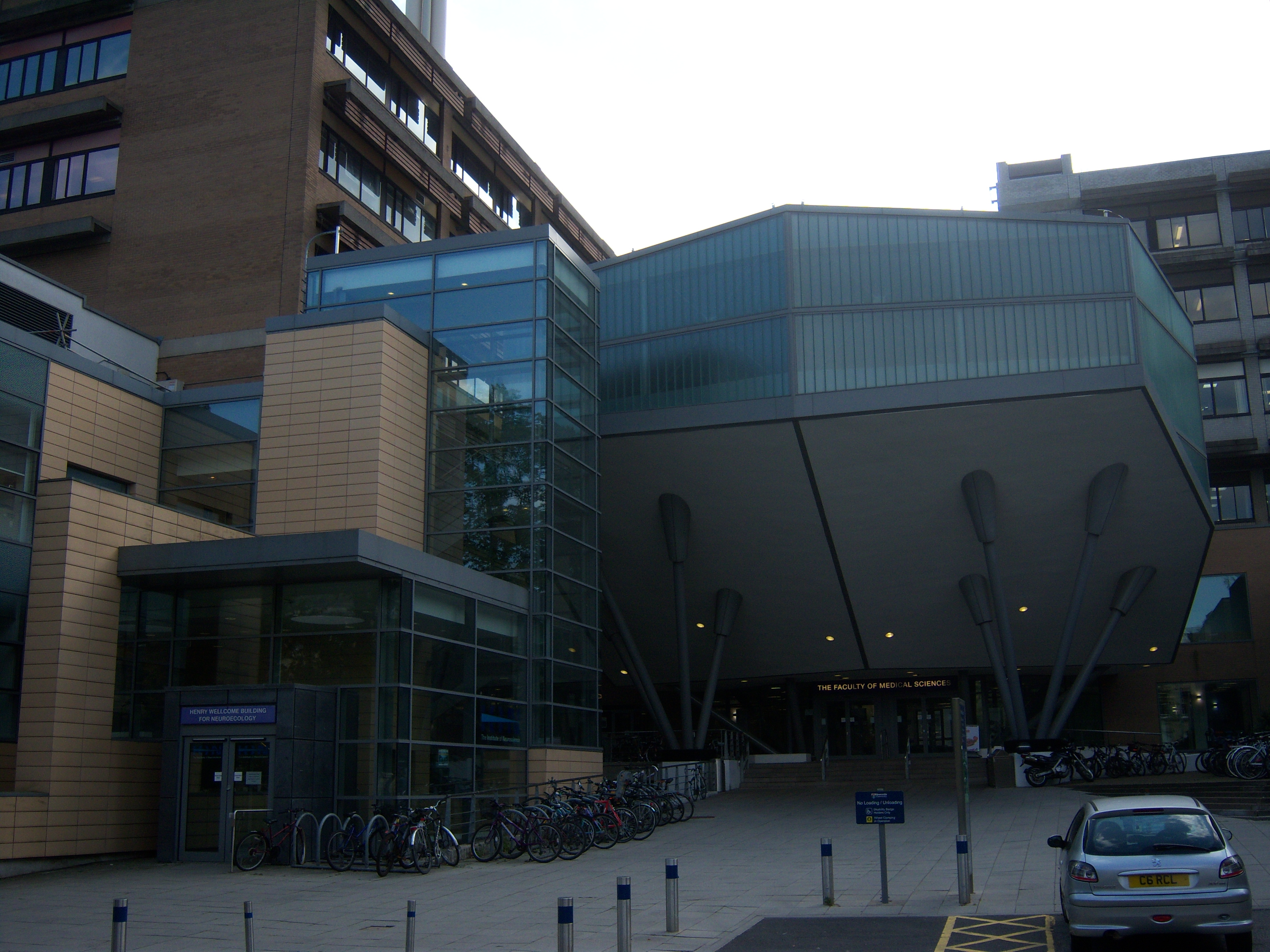
Main building of the medical school

As of 2020 the medical school admits some 367 students per year (including 26 from overseas) making it one of the largest medical schools in the UK. According to UCAS, Cambridge, Oxford, and Newcastle are the most academically selective universities for entry to study medicine in the United Kingdom. During the 2020 admissions cycle for both the four-year A101 graduate and five-year A100 undergraduate MBBS course, there were ten applicants for every place. Prospective students applying to the medical school for both the standard (five-year) and accelerated (four-year) programmes are required to sit the UCAT admission test. In 2020 the UCAT cut-off for invitation to interview for the A100 and A101 courses was 2730 and 2920 respectively for 2020 entry (scores in the 85th and 95th percentile of test-takers).

== Research ==
Newcastle Medical School hosts several Newcastle University Centres of Research Excellence (NUCoREs), including those dedicated to cancer, rare diseases, regenerative medicine, transplantation and advanced therapies, ageing and inequalities, and transformative neuroscience. In research leadership, the school leads multiple national and international research centres, including NIHR Newcastle Biomedical Research Centre, CRUK Newcastle Cancer Research Centre and Drug Discovery Programme, the National Renal Complement Therapeutics Centre, Cystic Fibrosis Trust Strategic Research Centre, and Versus Arthritis Rheumatoid Arthritis Centre of Excellence. In the 2021 Research Excellence Framework (REF), 89% of the school’s Clinical Medicine research was rated as either world-leading (4 star) or internationally excellent (3 star), with significant gains in overall research power since the previous assessment.

The school has a longstanding record of biomedical research, underpinning its clinical research infrastructure through collaboration with the Royal Victoria Infirmary since the early 20th century. In 2004, Newcastle scientists at the Centre for Life were the first group in the UK and Europe (second worldwide) to obtain a licence for human embryonic stem cell research. A year later, Newcastle researchers, led by professors Miodrag Stojkovic and Alison Murdoch based at the Centre for Life, were the first in the UK and among the first in Europe to clone a human embryo using somatic cell nuclear transfer.

In the field of oncology, researchers at Newcastle have played a key role in the development and clinical testing of novel anti-cancer therapies. Work at the Northern Institute for Cancer Research and the Sir Bobby Robson Cancer Trials Research Centre pioneered PARP1 inhibition, contributing directly to the drug discovery of Rucaparib, one of the first clinically approved PARP1 inhibitors now used in the treatment of ovarian cancer. The University also conducted the world’s first clinical trial of Berzosertib, a first-in-class ATR inhibitor targeting DNA damage response pathways in cancer. In addition, work led by Professor Christine Harrison has made important contributions to the understanding of childhood leukaemia through cytogenetic analysis, particularly in characterising chromosomal translocations associated with disease prognosis, which has resulted in improved survival for children with acute lymphoblastic leukaemia.

In neuromuscular research, Newcastle University hosts the John Walton Muscular Dystrophy Research Centre, one of only two Centres of Excellence for neuromuscular diseases in the UK. The centre combines specialist clinical care with laboratory research and is recognised as a world-leading research hub for neuromuscular diseases. Researchers at the centre delivered the UK’s first gene therapy for Duchenne muscular dystrophy (DMD) as part of the international EMBARK study, a major clinical trial evaluating treatments for DMD.

In reproductive medicine and mitochondrial genetics, researchers at Newcastle University, led by Professor Douglass Turnbull, pioneered internationally recognised work on mitochondrial replacement therapy. Using the pronuclear transfer technique, the team successfully transferred healthy mitochondrial DNA from donor eggs into eggs of women carrying mitochondrial disease, thereby preventing transmission of mitochondrial DNA diseases. In collaboration with the Newcastle upon Tyne Hospitals NHS Foundation Trust, Newcastle researchers were the first in the world to develop, refine, and receive official clinical licensing in 2017 to perform mitochondrial replacement therapy, also known as 'three parent IVF', as a strategy to prevent inherited mitochondrial disorders. Carried out through the Newcastle Fertility Centre, which remains the only centre licensed for mitochondrial replacement therapy in the UK, this technique has since led to the birth of eight children to date under clinical regulation.

== Malaysian campus ==
In 2008 the university announced that they were entering into an agreement to establish an international branch campus in Malaysia for the teaching of medical subjects. The development of the 5-hectare (13-acre) site in Johor, marks Newcastle University Medicine Malaysia (NUMed) as the 'anchor tenant' within the EduCity.

Staff moved into the NUMed Malaysia buildings in May 2011, in preparation for students arriving in August. The Malaysian Bell's Court building features a section which is designed to look like the Arches in Newcastle upon Tyne. The International Campus offers MBBS, which is currently accredited by both the General Medical Council and Malaysian Medical Council and Undergraduate Degrees in Biomedical sciences. Both programmes lead to a Newcastle University degree, and are identical to the course in the UK. The MBBS programme is recognised across the globe, with the medical school listed in the World Directory of Medical Schools

The main clinical teaching hospitals are Hospital Sultan Ismail and Hospital Sultanah Aminah in Johor Bahru, Hospital Sultanah Nora Ismail in Batu Pahat, Hospital Enche’ Besar Hajjah Khalsom in Kluang and a number of community clinics. All teaching and examinations are conducted in English, with the use of translators in clinical settings if required. Opportunities exist for students to spend time in the UK Campus, both through Student Selected Components (SSC), electives and intercalation.

There are currently over 700 students enrolled, from all over Malaysia and many countries of the world. There have been four cohorts of graduates from the MBBS programme (January 2018), with over 170 students. The Biomedical Sciences programme is a 2+1, with the final research-intensive year being conducted in the UK. It has graduated two cohorts of students to date. The Foundation in Science course opened in 2016, and students are guaranteed a place on the Biomedical Science or Medical degree programmes if they meet the academic criteria – in 2017 all met the criteria, and 86% chose to progress at NUMed.

== Notable Alumni and Staff ==
- John Snow, physician, founder of modern epidemiology and early germ theory.
- Frank Farmer, Professor of Medical Physics at Newcastle University (1966), inventor of Farmer dosimeter.
- Doug Turnbull (MBBS, PhD), Professor of Neurology, pioneered mitochondrial replacement therapy (MRT).
- James Shapiro (MBBS), surgeon, developed the Edmonton Protocol.
- Charles Cady Ungley (MBBS, MD), physician, known for demonstrating the therapeutic uses of vitamin B_{12} on pernicious anemia and advancing understanding of nutritional anemias.
- Joseph Stoddart (MBBS), anaesthetist and intensive care specialist, regarded as one of the founding fathers of intensive care medicine in the UK.
- Richard Gilbertson (MBBS, PhD), Senior Group Leader at the Cancer Research UK (CRUK) Cambridge Institute, director of the CRUK Cambridge Major Centre, Li Ka Shing Chair of Oncology at the University of Cambridge, and the 44th Master of Gonville & Caius College in the University of Cambridge.
- Patrick Chinnery (BMedSci, MBBS, PhD, FMedSci, FRS), neurologist, clinician scientist, and Wellcome Trust Principal Research Fellow based in the Medical Research Council Mitochondrial Biology Unit and the University of Cambridge, where he is also professor of neurology and head of the department of clinical neurosciences, Executive Chair of the Medical Research Council and a Director of Studies in Clinical Medicine at Gonville & Caius College.
- John Burn (BMedSci, MBBS, MD), Professor of Clinical Genetics, executive chairman of the Human Variome Project, helped create the Centre for Life, and led landmark research demonstrating that aspirin reduces cancer risk in hereditary Lynch syndrome.
- Donald Hamilton Irvine (MD, 1964), general practitioner, president of the General Medical Council (1995-2002), introduced professional revalidation in the UK.

== Deans and Pro-Vice-Chancellors ==
Following the merger of the College of Medicine with Armstrong College in 1937 the position of Dean of Medicine was created with a large degree of autonomy. A reorganisation of the university in 2002 led to this role being transferred to the Pro-Vice-Chancellor for Medical Sciences.

=== Deans of Medicine 1937–2002 ===
- Ronald Green (1937–1960)
- Andrew Lowdon (1960–1965)
- Henry Miller (1966–1968)
- George Smart (1968–1971)
- John Walton (1971–1981)
- David Shaw (1981–1990)
- Alex Crombie (1990–1995)
- George Alberti (1995–1997)
- Peter Baylis (1997–2002)

=== Pro-Vice-Chancellors (Medical Sciences) from 2002 ===
- Peter Baylis (2002–2004)
- Oliver James (2004–2008)
- Chris Day (2008–2017)
- David Burn (2017–2025)
- Quentin Anstee (2025–)
