= Charles Cady Ungley =

English physician and medical researcher

Charles Cady Ungley (14 July 1902, London – 21 August 1958, Newcastle upon Tyne) was an English physician and medical researcher, known for his research on the therapeutic uses of vitamin B_{12}. In 1938 he was the Goulstonian Lecturer.

== Biography ==
Ungley's brother, H. Gordon Ungley, became a surgeon and F.R.C.S. Their parents were an accountant Charles Ungley and his wife Grace Daisy Eleanor, née Goody. After secondary education at Archbishop Holgate's School, Charles C. Ungley matriculated at Durham University College of Medicine (now called Newcastle University Medical School). There he graduated MB BS in 1925 and MD in 1927. After further education at Durham University College of Medicine and resident appointments at Newcastle upon Tyne's Royal Victoria Infirmary, he was appointed in 1928 as a medical registrar at the Royal Victoria Infirmary and also qualified M.R.C.P.

At the beginning of his career, Ungley investigated neurology. His first paper was published in 1929, as coauthor with Moses M. Suzman (1904–1994), in the journal Brain. In 1930 Ungley was awarded a Rockefeller fellowship, which enabled him to study at Harvard Medical School and its teaching hospital Massachusetts General Hospital in Boston. There he was encouraged by William Bosworth Castle to study pernicious anaemia with therapeutic approaches using liver extracts, as well as purified vitamin B_{12}.

On 27 February 1932 in Jesmond, Charles Cady Ungley married Edith Holliday. At the Royal Victoria Infirmary he was promoted in 1935 to assistant physician; in the same year the Royal College of Physicians awarded him a Leverhulme scholarship enabling him to do further research. In 1937 he was elected F.R.C.P. In 1938 he delivered the Goulstonian Lectures, Some deficiencies of nutrition and their relation to disease, on March 3, 8th, and 10th.

During WW II he served as a surgeon commander with the Royal Navy Volunteer Reserve (R.N.V.R.), first at Aberdeenshire's Royal Naval Hospital and then at Durban. There he did research on immersion foot and other medical problems related to prolonged immersion in seawater. Because of his hospital work and his own health problems from essential hypertension, his research studies were incomplete but were eventually published in 1956 with coauthors Robert A. McCance, Elsie M. Widdowson, and Surgeon Commander J. W. L. Crossfil, R.N. (who retired in 1957).

In 1947 Ungley was appointed full physician at the Royal Victoria Infirmary. He gave essential help to E. Lester Smith's British team in their isolation and crystallisation of vitamin B_{12} in 1948. Ungley determined dose-response relationships for pernicious anaemia cases treated with the purified vitamin B_{12}. He was the first to demonstrate dramatic remissions in the cases treated with massive doses (3,000 micrograms) of orally administered vitamin B_{12}. The research of Ungley and his colleagues on the nutritional anaemias contributed to understanding megaloblastic anaemia in cases of pregnant women with folate deficiency and/or vitamin B_{12} deficiency. He also did significant research on the effects of vitamin C deficiency on wound healing.

In 1937 Durham University College of Medicine joined Armstrong College to form King's College, Durham (which in 1963 became the University of Newcastle upon Tyne). At the medical school of King's College, Durham, Ungley taught medical students. In 1952 at King's College, Durham, he started a scheme that took medical students and enlisted four general practitioners (one each with an urban, semiurban, small-town, or rural practice). Each of the four general practioneers took a medical student for one day each week to show the features of general practice. This scheme continued after Ungley's death in 1958.

Ungley enjoyed the hobbies of golf and piloting gliders until worsening health problems forced him to abandon those two hobbies, but he still enjoyed relaxation as an amateur oil painter. Upon his death in 1958 he was survived by his widow Edith and their one son and two daughters.

== Selected publications ==
- Suzman, M. M.; Muller, Gulli Lindh; Ungley, C. C. (1932). "An Attempt to Produce Spinal Cord Degeneration in Dogs Fed a High Cereal Diet Deficient in Vitamin A. The Incidental Development of a Syndrome of Anemia, Skin Lesions, Anorexia and Changes in the Concentration of Blood Lipoids". American Journal of Physiology. Legacy Content. 101 (3): 529–544. doi:10.1152/ajplegacy.1932.101.3.529.
- Ungley, C. C. (1933). "Recurrent Polyneuritis in Pregnancy and the Puerperium affecting Three Members of a Family". Journal of Neurology, Neurosurgery & Psychiatry. 14 (53): 15–26. doi:10.1136/jnnp.s1-14.53.15. PMC 1038859. PMID 21610756.
- Ungley, C.C.; Moffett, Robert (1936). "Observations on Castle's intrinsic factor in pernicious anemia". The Lancet. 227 (5883). Elsevier BV: 1232–1235. doi:10.1016/s0140-6736(00)56713-0. ISSN 0140-6736.
- Ungley, C. C.; Horton, J. S. F. (1943). "Sore and bleeding gums in naval personnel: Vitamin C and Nicotinic Acid Intakes". British Medical Bulletin. 1 (6). Oxford University Press (OUP): 69–70. doi:10.1093/oxfordjournals.bmb.a070199. ISSN 1471-8391.
- Ungley, C. C.; Channell, G. D.; Richards, R. L. (1945). "The immersion foot syndrome". British Journal of Surgery. 33 (129): 17–31. doi:10.1002/bjs.18003312903.
- Ungley, C. C.; Campbell H (1949). "Vitamin B_{12} in Pernicious Anaemia". BMJ. 2 (4641): 1370–1377. doi:10.1136/bmj.2.4641.1370. PMC 2051842. PMID 15397501.
- Ungley, C. C.; Thompson, R. B. (1950). "Vitamin B_{12} and Folic Acid in Megaloblastic Anaemias of Pregnancy and the Puerperium". BMJ. 1 (4659): 919–924. doi:10.1136/bmj.1.4659.919. PMC 2037551. PMID 15414314.
- Ungley, C. C. (1950). "Absorption of Vitamin B_{12} in Pernicious Anaemia: I. Oral Administration Without a Source of Intrinsic Factor". BMJ. 2 (4685): 905–908. doi:10.1136/bmj.2.4685.905. PMC 2039172. PMID 14772514.
- Ungley, C. C. (1950). "Absorption of Vitamin B_{12} in Pernicious Anaemia: II. Oral Administration with Normal Gastric Juice". BMJ. 2 (4685): 908–911. doi:10.1136/bmj.2.4685.908. PMC 2039122. PMID 14772515.
- Ungley, C. C.; Childs GA (1950). "Absorption of Vitamin B_{12} in Pernicious Anaemia: III. Failure of Fresh Milk or Concentrated Whey to Function as Castle's Intrinsic Factor or to Potentiate the Action of Orally Administered Vitamin B_{12}". BMJ. 2 (4685): 911–915. doi:10.1136/bmj.2.4685.911. PMC 2039128. PMID 14772516.
- Ungley, C. C. (1950). "Absorption of Vitamin B_{12} in Pernicious Anaemia: IV. Administration into Buccal Cavity, into Washed Segment of Intestine, or after Partial Sterilization of Bowel". BMJ. 2 (4685): 915–919. doi:10.1136/bmj.2.4685.915. PMC 2039145. PMID 14772517.
- Ungley, C. C.; Campbell, H. (1951). "Vitamin B_{12}c in Pernicious Anaemia and Subacute Combined Degeneration of Cord". BMJ. 1 (4699): 152–157. doi:10.1136/bmj.1.4699.152. PMC 2068276. PMID 14821354.
- Ungley, C. C. (1952). "The Pathogenesis of Megaloblastic Anaemias and the Value of Vitamin B_{12}". British Journal of Nutrition. 6 (3): 299–315. doi:10.1079/BJN19520032. PMID 12978216. S2CID 35185233.
- Latner, A. L.; Ungley, C. C.; Cox, E. V.; McEvoy-Bowe, E.; Raine, L. (1953). "Electrophoresis of Human Gastric Juice in Relation to Castle's Intrinsic Factor". BMJ. 1 (4808): 467–473. doi:10.1136/bmj.1.4808.467. PMC 2015395. PMID 13009251.
- Ross, G. I. M.; Mollin, D. L.; Cox, E. V.; Ungley, C. C. (1954). "Hematologic Responses and Concentration of Vitamin B_{12} in Serum and Urine following Oral Administration of Vitamin B_{12} without Intrinsic Factor". Blood. 9 (5): 473–488. doi:10.1182/blood.V9.5.473.473. PMID 13149628.
- Thompson, R. B.; Ungley, C. C. (1955). "Megaloblastic Anemia Associated with Anatomic Lesions in the Small Intestine". Blood. 10 (8): 771–787. doi:10.1182/blood.V10.8.771.771. PMID 13239725.
- Ungley, Charles C. (1955). The Chemotherapeutic Action of Vitamin B_{12}. Vitamins & Hormones. Vol. 13. pp. 137–211. doi:10.1016/S0083-6729(08)61025-0. ISBN 9780127098135. PMID 13291772.
- McCance, R. A.; Ungley, C. C.; Crosfill, J. W.; Widdowson, E. M. (1956). The Hazards to Men in Ships Lost at Sea, 1940-44, 291. Special Report Series, Medical Research Council, No. 291; v+44 pages abstract
- Ungley, C C (1958-08-01). "The Present Position of the Treatment of Megaloblastic Anaemias". Postgraduate Medical Journal. 34 (394). Oxford University Press (OUP): 412–418. doi:10.1136/pgmj.34.394.412. ISSN 0032-5473. PMC 2501730. PMID 13567167.
