= University of Alberta Faculty of Medicine and Dentistry =

Medical school in Edmonton, Alberta, Canada

Faculty of Medicine & Dentistry
- Type: Faculty
- Established: 1913; 113 years ago
- Affiliations: University of Alberta
- Dean: Brenda Hemmelgarn
- Undergraduates: 990
- Postgraduates: 1109
- Doctoral students: 565
- Location: Edmonton, Alberta, Canada
- Website: www.ualberta.ca/medicine

The University of Alberta Faculty of Medicine and Dentistry is located in Edmonton, Alberta, Canada. Established in 1913, it is one of the oldest medical schools in Western Canada and is composed of 21 departments, two stand-alone divisions, 9 research groups, and 24 research centers and institutes. Educational, clinical and research activities are conducted in 29 buildings on or near the University of Alberta north campus.

The Faculty of Medicine & Dentistry is home to more than 1,400 support staff and 2,760 tenure-track and clinical educators, including six National 3M Teaching Fellows, Canada's most prestigious teaching award for post-secondary instructors. According to an economic impact report conducted in 2013, the Faculty of Medicine & Dentistry generated approximately $2 billion to the Alberta economy in 2012.

== Education ==
The Faculty of Medicine & Dentistry, in 2018–19, had a research budget of $166 million.

The school runs the Scottish-Canadian Medical Programme jointly with the University of St Andrews School of Medicine and the University of Edinburgh Medical School, widely considered one of the top medical schools in the world in terms of reputation and research output.

Students study their undergraduate degree at St Andrews, train clinically in Edinburgh, and complete a clinical elective at the University of Alberta, for up to four months. Students graduate at the University of Edinburgh with British and Canadian clinical training. A vast majority of students get placed back in Canada or the United States for residency, with the remaining opting to practice in the United Kingdom.

== Research ==
The Faculty of Medicine & Dentistry offers four fully accredited undergraduate programs: doctor of medicine, doctor of dentistry, Bachelor of Science in medical laboratory science, and a diploma or Bachelor of Science in dental hygiene. The Bachelor of Science in radiation therapy, established in 2013, underwent accreditation review in fall 2016. It also offers more than 50 residency programs fully accredited by the Royal College of Physicians and Surgeons of Canada and 20 graduate programs centered in the health sciences.

The Faculty of Medicine & Dentistry has more than 2,600 learners in its undergraduate, graduate, residency, and postdoctoral education programs and has graduated nearly 14,000 health professionals and researchers.

== Notable alumni ==
Name	Class year	Notability	Reference(s)
Patrick Doyle	MD 1949	International leader in otolaryngology. Performed first cochlear implant surgery in Canada in 1982.	
Joseph B. Martin	MD 1962	Internationally renowned neurologist, researcher and administrator. Founder (1980) of National Institute of Health-Sponsored Huntington Disease Centre. Past Dean (1997–2007) of Harvard Medical School.	
D. Lorne Tyrrell	MD 1968	Canadian physician. Developed world's first oral antiviral drug for the treatment of Hepatitis B.	
Ray V. Rajotte	PhD 1975	Founder and director of Islet Transplantation Group. In 1999, demonstrated 100% success rate in freeing type 1 diabetics from daily insulin injections through the Edmonton Protocol.	
Andrew Wilkinson	MD 1984	Member of the Legislative Assembly of British Columbia and former Leader of the Official Opposition.	
Ray Muzyka, Greg Zeschuk, Augustine Yip	MD 1992	Co-Founders of Bioware, a video game developer based in Edmonton, Alberta	

== Faculty ==
- James Collip – played a role in the development of insulin
- Ban Tsui – developed the Tsui Test, a simple protocol using a low current electrical stimulation test to confirm catheter location in the epidural space during procedures.
- John Carter Callaghan – Performed first open-heart surgery in Canada in 1956.
- Gary Lobay & Henry Shumizu – part of the team of surgeons to perform Canada's first successful limb replantation in 1974
- Gary Lobay - first microsurgery in western Canada in 1974
- Henry Shumizu - co-founder of western Canada's first burn treatment center
- Lorne Tyrrell – created the first drug treatment of hepatitis B and 2015 Killiam Prize recipient. Former dean (1994–2004) and member of the Order of Canada.
- Ray Rajotte – international diabetes leader, renown for work related to the Edmonton Protocol islet transplantation procedure
- James Shapiro – member of the team that pioneered the Edmonton Protocol and continues to work to improve islet transplants
- Richard Fedorak – internationally renowned gastroenterologist specializing in inflammatory bowel disease. Former dean of the faculty (2016).
- Michael Houghton – co-discoverer of hepatitis C
- Tak Wah Mak – first to identify and clone T-cell receptor genes
- Joseph B. Martin (MD ’62) – member of the team that discovered a biomarker that led to locating the gene associated with Huntington's disease.
- Jonathan White – co-founder of Surgery 101 podcast and National 3M Teaching Fellow
- Arya Sharma – Canadian obesity expert
- Lori West – Canada Research Chair in Cardiac Transplantation and director of the Canada National Transplant Research Program.
- Toshifumi Yokota - pioneered antisense oligonucleotide-mediated therapeutics for muscular dystrophy.
