= Xing-Fang Li =

Canadian toxologist

Xing-Fang Li is a toxicologist whose research involves the discovery and identification of water contaminants through the development of new analytical technologies, as well as the engineering of solutions to ensure safe drinking water. Li is a professor at the Department of Laboratory Medicine and Pathology at the University of Alberta in Canada. She is a Canada Research Chair (Tier 1) in Analytical and Environmental Toxicology, and was appointed as a Fellow of the Royal Society of Canada in 2021.

== Career ==
Li completed a Bachelor of Science in Chemistry from Zhejiang University (1983), a Master of Science in Environmental Chemistry from the Research Centre for Eco-Environmental Sciences at the Chinese Academy of Sciences (1986), a Master of Science in Analytical Chemistry from Brock University in Canada (1990), and a PhD in Environmental/Analytical Chemistry from the University of British Columbia (1995). Li completed postdoctoral research at the University of Alberta (1994-1997), and later returned from industry to join as a professor at the University of Alberta's Faculty of Medicine and Dentistry in 2001.

Li has published over 150 academic publications, which have been cited over 10,000 times, resulting in an h-index and i10-index of 57 and 143 respectively. Previously, research from Li's lab found that measuring levels of the common artificial sweetener acesulfame potassium (Ace) is a way to determine the concentration of urine in pools. Their research found Ace in all 31 pools and hot tubs tested in two Canadian cities between May and August 2014, indicating that large amounts of human urine can be found in an average swimming pool.

In 2020, Li received the Chemical Institute of Canada's Ricardo Aroca Award for "a distinguished contribution to the field of analytical chemistry while working in Canada."

== Selected academic publications ==
- Arsenic binding to proteins. Shengwen Shen, Xing-Fang Li, William R Cullen, Michael Weinfeld, and X Chris Le. 2013. Chemical reviews.
- Drinking water disinfection byproducts (DBPs) and human health effects: multidisciplinary challenges and opportunities. Xing-Fang Li, William A Mitch. 2018. Environmental Science & Technology.
- DNA-mediated homogeneous binding assays for nucleic acids and proteins. Hongquan Zhang, Feng Li, Brittany Dever, Xing-Fang Li, X Chris Le. 2013. Chemical reviews.
- A microRNA-initiated DNAzyme motor operating in living cells. Hanyong Peng, Xing-Fang Li, Hongquan Zhang, X Chris Le. 2017. Nature communications.
