= Lunresertib =

Clinical data
- Other names: RP-6306

Identifiers
- IUPAC name: (1P)-2-amino-1-(3-hydroxy-2,6-dimethylphenyl)-5,6-dimethyl-1H-pyrrolo[2,3-b]pyridine-3-carboxamide
- CAS Number: 2719793-90-3
- PubChem CID: 156869388
- ChemSpider: 115008046
- UNII: N95U3A7N57
- KEGG: D12736
- ChEMBL: ChEMBL5199076

Chemical and physical data
- Formula: C_{18}H_{20}N_{4}O_{2}
- Molar mass: 324.384 g·mol^{−1}
- 3D model (JSmol): Interactive image
- SMILES: CC1=C(C(=C(C=C1)O)C)N2C(=C(C3=C2N=C(C(=C3)C)C)C(=O)N)N
- InChI: InChI=InChI=1S/C18H20N4O2/c1-8-5-6-13(23)10(3)15(8)22-16(19)14(17(20)24)12-7-9(2)11(4)21-18(12)22/h5-7,23H,19H2,1-4H3,(H2,20,24); Key:ARBRHWRTXPWZGN-UHFFFAOYSA-N

Lunresertib is an investigational new drug that is being evaluated for the treatment of cancer. It is an oral small molecule inhibitor of PKMYT1, developed by Repare Therapeutics. This drug targets cell cycle regulation in tumors with specific genetic alterations, including CCNE1 amplifications or FBXW7 and PPP2R1A loss of function mutations. It is currently in phase 1/2 clinical trials, both as monotherapy or in combination with camonsertib, an ATR inhibitor.
