= Legalising Mitochondrial Donation =

2018 book by Rebecca Dimond and Neil Stephens

- Authors: Rebecca Dimond and Neil Stephens
- Language: English
- Publisher: Palgrave Pivot
- Publication date: 2018
- Publication place: United Kingdom
- Media type: Print
- Pages: 147
- ISBN: 978-3-319-74644-9

Legalising Mitochondrial Donation is a 2018 book by the sociologists Rebecca Dimond and Neil Stephens, published by Palgrave Pivot. The book is about how the United Kingdom became the first country to legalise mitochondrial donation in 2015. The book engages with the public debate surrounding the introduction of mitochondrial donation. The book was shortlisted for the 2019 Foundation for the Sociology of Health and Illness Book Prize.

== Contents ==
The book begins with the authors describing the scope of their study, accompanied by an overview of their data, methodological approach, and theoretical orientation. In this first part of the book, Dimond and Stephens introduce the idea of 'enacting ethical futures' Chapter two address the cluster in favour of the legalisation of mitochondrial donation, highlighting the role of Douglass Turnbull in the 'for' cluster. Chapter three then turns to the cluster against the legalisation of mitochondrial donation, unpacking why different individuals and organisations were opposed to the legalisation but could not produce as coherent and unified a campaign as the for cluster. Chapter four focuses on policy work. Chapter five addresses the role of patient-families. Chapter six analyses debates in the Parliament of the United Kingdom. The final chapter interprets the book's findings through Dimond and Stephens' 'enacting ethical futures' framework.

== Reception ==
In a review for Health: An Interdisciplinary Journal for the Social Study of Health, Illness and Medicine, Katharine Dow wrote that the book "makes a strong contribution to understandings of British reproductive science and its regulation".

Fiona Coyle, reviewing the book in Sociology of Health & Illness, said that the book "contributes to wider science and technology studies (STS) commentary on mitochondrial donation and is rich with data extracts, from both stakeholder interviews and documentary analysis". Coyle praised the book's "strong empirical and conceptual investigations", suggesting that it may be of interest to scholars working in "social constructivist approaches to new and emerging biomedical and, or, assisted reproductive technologies".

Reviewing the book for New Genetics and Society, Kenneth Taylor described it as "a welcome and useful addition to the literature".

=== Awards ===
- Shortlist: Foundation for the Sociology of Health and Illness Book Prize (2019).
