= Alnodesertib =

Investigational drug

Clinical data
- Other names: GTPL13731; BDBM570448; ART-0380; IACS-030380

Identifiers
- IUPAC name: 4-[4-[(cyclopropyl-methyl-oxo-λ^{6}-sulfanylidene)amino]-6-[(3R)-3-methylmorpholin-4-yl]pyrimidin-2-yl]pyridin-2-amine
- CAS Number: 2267316-76-5
- PubChem CID: 145766632
- IUPHAR/BPS: 13731
- ChemSpider: 129644222
- ChEMBL: ChEMBL5505926

Chemical and physical data
- Formula: C_{18}H_{24}N_{6}O_{2}S
- Molar mass: 388.49 g·mol^{−1}
- 3D model (JSmol): Interactive image
- SMILES: C[C@@H]1COCCN1C2=NC(=NC(=C2)N=[S@](=O)(C)C3CC3)C4=CC(=NC=C4)N
- InChI: InChI=InChI=1S/C18H24N6O2S/c1-12-11-26-8-7-24(12)17-10-16(23-27(2,25)14-3-4-14)21-18(22-17)13-5-6-20-15(19)9-13/h5-6,9-10,12,14H,3-4,7-8,11H2,1-2H3,(H2,19,20)/t12-,27+/m1/s1; Key:JHPDHYAMSPMBIF-MUDIAHQHSA-N

Alnodesertib is an investigational new drug that is being developed by Artios Pharma for the treatment of solid tumours. It is an ataxia telangiectasia and Rad3 related (ATR) protein inhibitor.

== Clinical trials ==
Alnodesertib is currently in clinical trials for solid tumors. Another study was terminated "not for reasons affecting the benefit-risk balance".
