= Ernest Lester Smith =

- Born: 7 August 1904; Teddington
- Died: 6 November 1992 (aged 88); Bradfield St George
- Occupation: Biochemist

Ernest Lester Smith FRS (7 August 1904, Teddington – 6 November 1992, Bradfield St George) was an English biochemist, Theosophist and vegetarian. He is known for his role in the UK's production of penicillin during World War II and for the postwar isolation of vitamin B_{12} from liver.

== Biography ==
E. Lester Smith was the only child of Lester Davis Smith (1877–1962) and Rose Annie Smith née Nettleton (1877–1940). Smith's father was a Theosophist and vegetarian who was widely read in ethics and religion. His mother was also a Theosophist, but was not enthusiastic about following a vegetarian diet. Smith became a vegetarian at an early age.

During World War I, Smith's father was a politically active pacifist and conscientious objector and in 1917 he became unemployed because of his anti-war activities. After secondary education from 1916 to 1920 at Wood Green County School, Smith wanted to study chemistry at a university. However, his family's poverty caused him to delay his formal education. He worked for a year in a pharmacy near the British Museum. From 1921 to 1925 he studied the BSc course in physics, chemistry, and mathematics at Chelsea Polytechnic (which went through several transitions and eventually became the Chelsea Campus of King's College London).

In 1925, at the age of 21, he passed the examination for the Associateship (a qualification equivalent to a bachelor's degree) of the Royal Institute of Chemistry (which became in 1980 the Royal Society of Chemistry) and the London External BSc (granted by the University of London) with 1st class honours in chemistry. He spent an additional year at Chelsea Polytechnic to work for an MSc, which he completed by 1926. In 1927 the Journal of the Chemical Society published three of his papers.

Smith became an employee of the Glaxo Department of Joseph Nathan & Company in January 1926 and continued working for Glaxo until his retirement in 1964. On behalf of Glaxo, he was the author or co-author of twelve patents related to his collaborative research on penicillin, long-chain aliphatic amines, vitamin B_{12}, and other topics. In 1931 in Holloway, London, he married Winifred Rose Fitch (1907–1989). During his career, Glaxo underwent several reorganisations. In 1935 the Glaxo Department became a separate subsidiary, Glaxo Laboratories Ltd., and moved to a new facility in Greenford — for many years, Smith and his wife lived in a house in Pinner. In 1947 Joseph Nathan & Company ceased to exist, and Glaxo Laboratories became a separate company, but the Smiths continued to live in Pinner until 1964.

At the beginning of his career at Glaxo, E. Lester Smith continued the work, started by Harry Jephcott and Alfred L. Bacharach, on efficient extraction of vitamin A, as well as vitamin D, from fish-liver oils. While pursuing his research on such vitamin extraction, Smith realised that his work, on the cold saponification of these fish-liver oils together with solvent extraction of unsaponifiable matter containing the vitamins, provided promising material for writing a doctoral thesis. With a leave of absence from Glaxo, he registered for a PhD with the London University and returned to Chelsea Polytechnic for 6 months before returning to Glaxo in 1931. After three years of working full time at Glaxo and part time at Chelsea Polytechnic, his research was published and presented, not for the PhD but, on his tutor's recommendation, upgraded for a D.Sc., which was awarded in 1933 by the University of London.

Following George R. Minot and William P. Murphy’s 1926 paper Treatment of pernicious anaemia by a special diet, researchers made intensive efforts to extract from liver the factor for treatments of pernicious anaemia. In 1935 the pharmacists Per Laland and Aage Klem of the Norwegian pharmaceutical company Nyegaard & Co. devised a method for making a purified liver extract, for which injection successfully treated cases of pernicious anaemia. Glaxo obtained a licence to manufacture the extract and sent Smith, in September 1936, to Oslo to master the process. Glaxo manufactured the extract at Greenford and in 1937 started marketing the extract under the name ‘Examen’. Smith's work to improve the Laland-Klem process and to isolate the active principle, was halted when WW II started in September 1939.

At the beginning of WW II, Glaxo diverted Smith to development work on wartime production of medical products. Following the 1940 publication of the paper Penicillin as a chemotherapeutic agent by Ernst Chain, Howard Florey, and five other co-authors, Glaxo began working on possible production methods for penicillin. Glaxo's factories, despite wartime shortages, provided more than 80% of the British penicillin available for the June 1944 D-day invasion. Smith played a wide-ranging and important role in Glaxo's production of penicillin. in

In 1946 Smith resumed his research on liver extracts and pernicious anaemia. He made great progress by using partition chromatography. In 1948, almost simultaneously with an American team led by Merck's Karl Folkers, Smith's team isolated vitamin B_{12} in crystalline form. Using samples supplied by Smith, Charles Cady Ungley demonstrated that the newly isolated factor was highly effective as a treatment for pernicious anaemia. Smith's team made the first physical measurements on vitamin B_{12} and thoroughly researched the vitamin's physical and chemical properties. His team collaborated extensively with Alexander Todd's group in Cambridge and with Dorothy Hodgkin's laboratory in Oxford. The story of the research on pernicious anaemia, liver extracts, and vitamin B_{12}, up to 1964, is told by E. Lester Smith in his monograph Vitamin B_{12} (3rd edition, 1965).

In 1957 Smith was elected a Fellow of the Royal Society. He was awarded in 1954 the gold medal in Therapeutics of the Worshipful Society of Apothecaries, in 1955 the Lister Memorial Lectureship of the Society of Chemical Industry, and in 1967 the Hanbury Gold Medal of the Pharmaceutical Society.

In 1964, upon his retirement, Smith and his wife Winifred moved to Three Oaks, East Sussex, where he worked on horticulture with a focus on primulas and plant breeding. He won many prizes at flower shows. In 1962 the Royal Horticultural Society awarded him the Lindley Medal for a display of double auriculas. In 1973 he became affected by congestive heart failure and, consequently, gave up gardening. He and his wife moved to a home for elderly vegetarians in Hastings, where they lived until 1989 when she died from a heart attack. He then moved to a house at Bradfield St George, where he did some gardening. He shared the house with Mrs Sylvine Lloyd, an old family friend, who helped him as secretary, housekeeper, and chauffeuse. He died suddenly in 1992.

== Theosophy ==
As a student and young man, Smith attended Theosophical gatherings. Throughout his life he pursued his interest in Theosophy with vegetarianism and met many persons who shared his views on Theosophy and left-wing politics. In 1928, he joined Theosophical Society. In 1963, he delivered a Theosophy lecture titled Science and the Real. In 1977 the Theosophical Society awarded him the Subba Row Medal.

For Theosophical Publishing House, Smith was the editor of The Dynamic Universe (1963) with Corona Trew and Intelligence Came First (1975). The latter book argued that evolution is directed by intelligent design. He also authored Occult Chemistry Re-Evaluated (1982), Our Last Adventure (1985) a book on life after death and Inner Adventures: Thought, Intuition, and Beyond (1988).

== Selected publications ==
- Smith, E. Lester; Stern, Babette E.; Young, F. E. (1938). "Effect of Solvents on the Absorption Spectrum of Vitamin A". Nature. 141 (3569): 551–552. Bibcode:1938Natur.141..551S. doi:10.1038/141551b0. S2CID 4142713.
- Smith, E. Lester (1948). "Purification of Anti-pernicious Anæmia Factors from Liver". Nature. 161 (4095): 638–639. Bibcode:1948Natur.161..638S. doi:10.1038/161638a0. PMID 18856623.
- —— (1948). "Presence of Cobalt in the Anti-Pernicious Anæmia Factor". Nature. 162 (4108): 144–145. Bibcode:1948Natur.162..144S. doi:10.1038/162144b0. PMID 18871480. S2CID 10126943.
- ——; Page, J. E. (1948). "The acid-binding properties of long-chain aliphatic amines". Journal of the Society of Chemical Industry. 67 (2): 48–51. doi:10.1002/jctb.5000670203.
- —— (July 1950). "Isolation and Chemistry of Vitamin B_{12}". Proceedings of the Royal Society of Medicine. 43 (7): 535–536. doi:10.1177/003591575004300707. PMC 2081364. PMID 15440769.
- —— (1951). "The Vitamin B_{12} Group of Factors". BMJ. 1 (4699): 151–152. doi:10.1136/bmj.1.4699.151. PMC 2068275. PMID 14821353.
- —— (1951). "Radioactive Penicillin and Vitamin B_{12}". British Medical Bulletin. 8 (2–3): 203–205. doi:10.1093/oxfordjournals.bmb.a074107. PMID 14935231.
- —— (1952). "Pitfalls in Partition Chromatography". Nature. 169 (4289). Springer Science and Business Media LLC: 60–62. Bibcode:1952Natur.169...60S. doi:10.1038/169060a0. ISSN 0028-0836. PMID 14910685.
- —— (1952). "Tracer studies with the B_{12} vitamins. 1. Neutron irradiation of vitamin B12". Biochemical Journal. 52 (3): 384–387. doi:10.1042/bj0520384. PMC 1198007. PMID 13018242.
- ——; Mervyn, L.; Johnson, A. W.; Shaw, N. (1962). "Partial Synthesis of Vitamin B_{12} Coenzyme and Analogues". Nature. 194 (4834): 1175. Bibcode:1962Natur.194.1175S. doi:10.1038/1941175a0. PMID 13914206. S2CID 4144386.
- —— (11 June 1964). "A triumph of vitamin chemistry". New Scientist. 22 (395): 660–661.
