= Ceralasertib =

Chemical compound

Clinical data
- Other names: AZD-6738

Legal status
- Legal status: Investigational

Identifiers
- IUPAC name: imino-methyl-[1-[6-[(3R)-3-methylmorpholin-4-yl]-2-(1H-pyrrolo[2,3-b]pyridin-4-yl)pyrimidin-4-yl]cyclopropyl]-oxo-lambda6-sulfane
- CAS Number: 1352226-88-0
- PubChem CID: 54761306
- IUPHAR/BPS: 9390
- DrugBank: DB14917
- ChemSpider: 58828171
- UNII: 85RE35306Z
- KEGG: D11787
- ChEMBL: ChEMBL4285417
- PDB ligand: VJM (PDBe, RCSB PDB)
- ECHA InfoCard: 100.232.607

Chemical and physical data
- Formula: C_{20}H_{24}N_{6}O_{2}S
- Molar mass: 412.51 g·mol^{−1}
- 3D model (JSmol): Interactive image
- SMILES: C[C@@H]1COCCN1C2=NC(=NC(=C2)C3(CC3)[S@](=N)(=O)C)C4=C5C=CNC5=NC=C4
- InChI: InChI=1S/C20H24N6O2S/c1-13-12-28-10-9-26(13)17-11-16(20(5-6-20)29(2,21)27)24-19(25-17)15-4-8-23-18-14(15)3-7-22-18/h3-4,7-8,11,13,21H,5-6,9-10,12H2,1-2H3,(H,22,23)/t13-,29-/m1/s1; Key:OHUHVTCQTUDPIJ-JYCIKRDWSA-N

Ceralasertib is an investigational new drug that is being evaluated for the treatment of cancer. It is an ATR kinase inhibitor.
