= Camonsertib =

Clinical data
- Other names: RP-3500

Identifiers
- IUPAC name: (1R,5S)-3-[6-[(3R)-3-methylmorpholin-4-yl]-1-(1H-pyrazol-5-yl)pyrazolo[3,4-b]pyridin-4-yl]-8-oxabicyclo[3.2.1]octan-3-ol
- CAS Number: 2417489-10-0
- PubChem CID: 156487652
- IUPHAR/BPS: 12073
- ChemSpider: 127408990
- UNII: S1Z7Y5G56T
- KEGG: D12321
- ChEBI: CHEBI:229722
- ChEMBL: ChEMBL5095260

Chemical and physical data
- Formula: C_{21}H_{26}N_{6}O_{3}
- Molar mass: 410.478 g·mol^{−1}
- 3D model (JSmol): Interactive image
- SMILES: C[C@@H]1COCCN1C2=NC3=C(C=NN3C4=CC=NN4)C(=C2)C5(C[C@H]6CC[C@@H](C5)O6)O
- InChI: InChI=InChI=1S/C21H26N6O3/c1-13-12-29-7-6-26(13)19-8-17(21(28)9-14-2-3-15(10-21)30-14)16-11-23-27(20(16)24-19)18-4-5-22-25-18/h4-5,8,11,13-15,28H,2-3,6-7,9-10,12H2,1H3,(H,22,25)/t13-,14-,15+,21?/m1/s1; Key:YIHHYCIYAIVQKX-YNOVCBQDSA-N

Camonsertib is an investigational new drug that is being evaluated for the treatment of cancer. It is a selective oral small molecule inhibitor of ATR (Ataxia telangiectasia and Rad3 related), developed by Repare Therapeutics. This drug targets tumors with specific genetic alterations that create vulnerabilities in DNA damage response (DDR) pathways, particularly those with ATM or BRCA1/BRCA2 mutations. It is currently in Phase 2 clinical trials both as a monotherapy and in combination with other agents, including PARP inhibitors, gemcitabine, and lunresertib.
