= Elimusertib =

Identifiers
- IUPAC name: (3R)-3-methyl-4-[4-(2-methylpyrazol-3-yl)-8-(1H-pyrazol-5-yl)-1,7-naphthyridin-2-yl]morpholine
- CAS Number: 1876467-74-1
- PubChem CID: 118869362
- IUPHAR/BPS: 10354
- DrugBank: DB19041
- ChemSpider: 64854199
- UNII: 7N13IK9LNH
- ChEMBL: ChEMBL4647810

Chemical and physical data
- Formula: C_{20}H_{21}N_{7}O
- Molar mass: 375.436 g·mol^{−1}
- 3D model (JSmol): Interactive image
- SMILES: C[C@@H]1COCCN1C2=NC3=C(C=CN=C3C4=CC=NN4)C(=C2)C5=CC=NN5C
- InChI: InChI=1S/C20H21N7O/c1-13-12-28-10-9-27(13)18-11-15(17-5-8-23-26(17)2)14-3-6-21-20(19(14)24-18)16-4-7-22-25-16/h3-8,11,13H,9-10,12H2,1-2H3,(H,22,25)/t13-/m1/s1; Key:YBXRSCXGRPSTMW-CYBMUJFWSA-N

Elimusertib (Bay 1895344) is an experimental anticancer drug which acts as an inhibitor of ataxia telangiectasia and Rad3 related protein. This is involved in DNA repair following damage, and so inhibiting this protein causes cancer cells to become more vulnerable to other chemotherapy drugs. Elimusertib is in early stage clinical trials against advanced solid tumors.
