= John J. Zhang =

Medical scientist

- 张进
- Other name: Zhang Jin
- Education: M.D., M.Sc., Ph.D.
- Alma mater: Zhejiang University School of Medicine
- Known for: In vitro fertilisation; Three-parent baby
- Scientific career
- Fields: Gynaecology, Embryology
- Workplaces: New York University School of Medicine; New Hope Fertility Center
- Website: drjohnzhang.com

John Jin Zhang (Chinese: 张进; pinyin: Zhāng Jìn) is a medical scientist who has made contributions in fertility research, and particularly in in vitro fertilization. He made headlines in September 2016 for successfully producing the world's first three-parent baby using the spindle transfer technique of mitochondrial replacement. Having obtained an M.D. from Zhejiang University School of Medicine, an M.Sc. from University of Birmingham, and a Ph.D. from University of Cambridge, he became the founder and medical director of New Hope Fertility Center in New York, USA.

== Biography ==
John Zhang studied at the Zhejiang University School of Medicine in China, and graduated with an MD in 1984. He continued a post-graduate course at the University of Birmingham, UK. He studied male fertility on which he earned an M.Sc. in 1985. He received the British Postgraduate Scholarship in 1989 with which he pursued further research at the University of Cambridge. He obtained a Ph.D. in 1991 for his thesis on in vitro maturation and fertilization of mammalian oocytes. Between 1991 and 1993, he worked as a post-doctoral scholar at Georgetown University in US. From 1993 to 1997, he coordinated a Rockefeller Foundation research programme of Georgetown University with Peking University. He completed residency in the Department of Obstetrics and Gynaecology at the New York University School of Medicine in 1997. He became the first Fellow in the Division of Reproductive Endocrinology and Infertility of New York University School of Medicine in 2001. In 2004, he founded the New Hope Fertility Center in New York City, becoming its Medical Director. The clinic has been extended to China, Russia, and Mexico.

== Scientific contributions ==
In 2003, while working with researchers at the Sun Yat-Sen University of Medical Science, Zhang experimented with a mitochondrial donation technique called pronuclear transfer to help a Chinese woman who had a fertility problem. He used a healthy egg cell (ovum) from a donor woman, from which he removed the nucleus. He extracted only the young nuclei (pronuclei) from the mother and her husband, and introduced them into the host egg cell, hence the popular name "three-parent baby". There was about 70% success in fertilization. Five embryos were implanted in the mother's uterus, and she became pregnant. Zhang published a preliminary report in 2003 in the journal Fertility and Sterility. However, he was careful of the outcome and did not disclose the full data and results. He had regret for breaking the news so soon, blaming his collaborator as "so eager to be famous". As it happened, none of the embryos survived to full term. He made the full report only after 13 years, in October 2016.

In order to help a woman in Mexico who had a genetic-neurological trait called Leigh syndrome, Zhang used the spindle transfer technique in 2015. Leigh syndrome in the mother is due to mutations in the mitochondrial DNA. The mother already had four miscarriages, and even in the two successful births, the children suffered from the disease and died. Therefore, the only solution was to replace the mutant genes with healthy ones. Zhang and his team took the nucleus from the mother's egg cell and inserted it into a different egg, taken from a donor woman with no genetic abnormality, which had had its original nucleus removed. Thus, the mother's nucleus replaced the nucleus in a donor cell, which had genetically normal mitochondria. The new egg cell was then fertilized with the father's sperm. Zhang could produce only one normally developing embryo out of five he created. The embryo was then implanted in the mother's uterus, and a healthy boy was born nine months later, on 6 April 2016. The study was published in the September 2016 issue of Fertility and Sterility.

=== Criticisms and comments ===
Although the baby does not indicate symptoms of Leigh syndrome, there are still concerns over the genetic conditions. According to the first report, the technique did not completely remove the mother's mitochondria, such that about 1-2% of her faulty mtDNA remained. However, it is generally considered that less than 20% is too low to cause any problems.

There are also concerns over ethical and legal issues. There is an argument that the technique is very close to human cloning, which is generally objected to. There is also opposition to the nuclear transfer method due to the waste of embryos, or potential risk to children born by the technique. The latter point is particularly evidenced by the death of the fetuses in China in the earlier experimentation, which caused China to ban the technique. In the US, the FDA restricts any mitochondrial transfer techniques in humans, and requires an Investigational New Drug application. In contrast, the UK became the first country to legalize it, in 2015. However, Zhang chose the clinic branch in Mexico, saying that "there are no rules [there]". He commented that "To save lives is the ethical thing to do." Sian Harding, a member of the British Nuffield Council on Bioethics and the Scientific Advisory Board of the PPP "Stem Cells for Safer Medicines", also defended Zhang, saying that there was no deliberate destruction of embryos, and said, "It's as good as or better than what we'll do in the UK."

As of 2019, his affiliations with scientist He Jiankui has been questioned in regards to his involvement and knowledge of the gene edited babies, Lulu and Nana. It was reported that Zhang intended to open a medical tourism business in Hainan for gene-edited babies.

== Honours ==
Zhang is a founder and member of the Life Science Society at Cambridge University. He is a consultant for Reproductive Nuclear Transfer and Stem Cell Research, Cellular Reconstruction and the Special Programme of Therapeutic Cloning at Sun Yat-sen University, Guangzhou. He is also a consultant for the IVF and Gamete Laboratory at the Fertility Centre of Wenzhou Medical College, Zhejiang Province, China. He is a member of British Fertility Society, and of the American Society for Reproductive Medicine (ASRM).

In May 2020, The Times featured Zhang on their 'Science Power List.'
