= Ataxia telangiectasia and Rad3 related =

Protein kinase that detects DNA damage and halts cell division

ATR
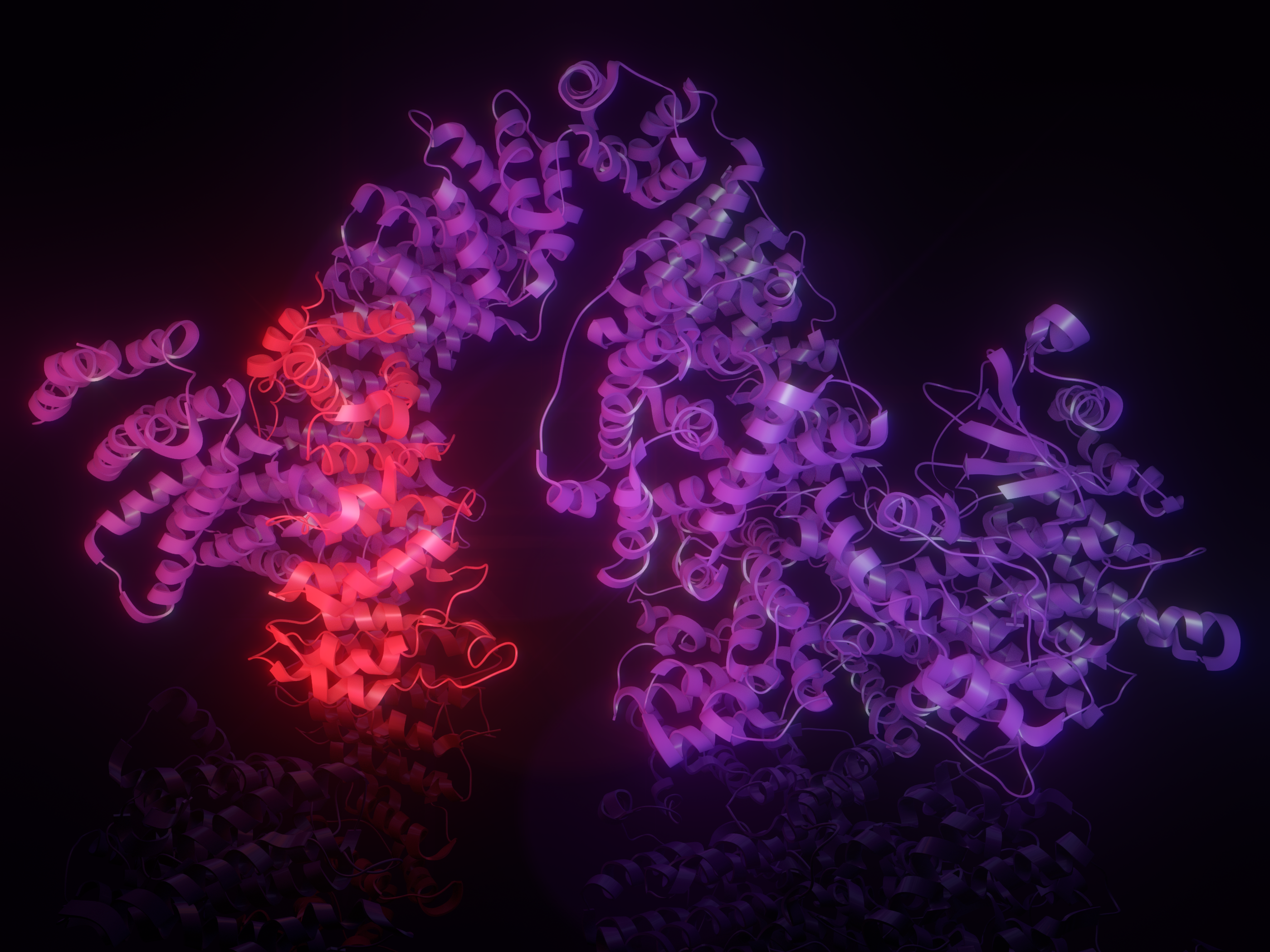

Identifiers
- Aliases: ATR, ATR serine/threonine kinase, FCTCS, FRP1, MEC1, SCKL, SCKL1
- External IDs: OMIM: 601215; MGI: 108028; GeneCards: ATR
Enzyme activity
EC #	BRENDA	ExPASy	KEGG	MetaCyc
2.7.11.1	↗	↗	↗	↗

Gene location (Human)
Chr.	Chromosome 3 (human)
Band	3q23	Start	142,449,007 bp
Band	3q23	End	142,578,733 bp

Gene location (Mouse)
Chr.	Chromosome 9 (mouse)
Band	9|9 E3.3	Start	95,739,650 bp
Band	9|9 E3.3	End	95,833,834 bp
RNA expression pattern
Bgee	Human / Mouse (ortholog); Top expressed in: Brodmann area 23; epithelium of nasopharynx; endothelial cell; caput epididymis; tibia; Epithelium of choroid plexus; corpus epididymis; germinal epithelium; middle temporal gyrus; bronchial epithelial cell / Top expressed in: spermatocyte; spermatid; seminiferous tubule; Gonadal ridge; Rostral migratory stream; tail of embryo; pineal gland; primary oocyte; epiblast; ovary; More reference expression data
BioGPS	n/a
Gene ontology
Molecular function	transferase activity; DNA binding; protein kinase activity; nucleotide binding; kinase activity; MutSalpha complex binding; protein binding; MutLalpha complex binding; ATP binding; protein serine/threonine kinase activity
Cellular component	PML body; Golgi apparatus; nucleoplasm; chromosome; nucleus
Biological process	interstrand cross-link repair; phosphorylation; establishment of protein-containing complex localization to telomere; replicative senescence; cellular response to UV; DNA damage checkpoint signaling; positive regulation of telomerase catalytic core complex assembly; negative regulation of DNA replication; positive regulation of telomere maintenance via telomerase; protein localization to chromosome, telomeric region; multicellular organism development; DNA replication; peptidyl-serine phosphorylation; cellular response to gamma radiation; regulation of cellular response to heat; protein autophosphorylation; positive regulation of DNA damage response, signal transduction by p53 class mediator; DNA repair; establishment of RNA localization to telomere; cellular response to DNA damage stimulus; telomere maintenance; regulation of signal transduction by p53 class mediator
Sources:Amigo / QuickGO
Orthologs
Databases	NCBI: entry; OMA: entry
Species	Human	Mouse
Entrez	545	245000
Ensembl	ENSG00000175054	ENSMUSG00000032409
UniProt	Q13535	Q9JKK8
RefSeq (mRNA)	NM_001184; NM_001354579	NM_019864
RefSeq (protein)	NP_001175; NP_001341508	n/a
Location (UCSC)	Chr 3: 142.45 – 142.58 Mb	Chr 9: 95.74 – 95.83 Mb
PubMed search
- Wikidata
View/Edit Human	View/Edit Mouse

Serine/threonine-protein kinase ATR, also known as ataxia telangiectasia and Rad3-related protein (ATR) or FRAP-related protein 1 (FRP1), is an enzyme that, in humans, is encoded by the ATR gene. It is a large kinase of about 301.66 kDa. ATR belongs to the phosphatidylinositol 3-kinase-related kinase protein family. ATR is activated in response to single strand breaks, and works with ATM to ensure genome integrity.

== Function ==
ATR is a serine/threonine-specific protein kinase that is involved in sensing DNA damage and activating the DNA damage checkpoint, leading to cell cycle arrest in eukaryotes. ATR is activated in response to persistent single-stranded DNA, which is a common intermediate formed during DNA damage detection and repair. Single-stranded DNA occurs at stalled replication forks and as an intermediate in DNA repair pathways such as nucleotide excision repair and homologous recombination repair. ATR is activated during more persistent issues with DNA damage; within cells, most DNA damage is repaired quickly and faithfully through other mechanisms.

ATR works with a partner protein called ATRIP to recognize single-stranded DNA coated with RPA. RPA binds specifically to ATRIP, which then recruits ATR through an ATR activating domain (AAD) on its surface. This association of ATR with RPA is how ATR specifically binds to and works on single-stranded DNA—this was proven through experiments with cells that had mutated nucleotide excision pathways. In these cells, ATR was unable to activate after UV damage, showing the need for single stranded DNA for ATR activity. The acidic alpha-helix of ATRIP binds to a basic cleft in the large RPA subunit to create a site for effective ATR binding.

Many other proteins exist that are recruited to the cite of ssDNA that are needed for ATR activation. While RPA recruits ATRIP, the RAD9-RAD1-HUS1 (9-1-1) complex is loaded onto the DNA adjacent to the ssDNA; though ATRIP and the 9-1-1 complex are recruited independently to the site of DNA damage, they interact extensively through massive phosphorylation once colocalized. The 9-1-1 complex, a ring-shaped molecule related to PCNA, allows the accumulation of ATR in a damage specific way. For effective association of the 9-1-1 complex with DNA, RAD17-RFC is also needed. This complex also brings in topoisomerase binding protein 1 (TOPBP1) which binds ATR through a highly conserved AAD. TOPBP1 binding is dependent on the phosphorylation of the Ser387 residue of the RAD9 subunit of the 9-1-1 complex. This is likely one of the main functions of the 9-1-1 complex within this DNA damage response.

Another important protein that binds TR was identified by Haahr et al. in 2016: Ewings tumor-associated antigen 1 (ETAA1). This protein works in parallel with TOPBP1 to activate ATR through a conserved AAD. It is hypothesized that this pathway, which works independently of TOPBP1 pathway, is used to divide labor and possibly respond to differential needs within the cell. It is hypothesized that one pathway may be most active when ATR is carrying out normal support for replicating cells, and the other may be active when the cell is under more extreme replicative stress.

It is not just ssDNA that activates ATR, though the existence of RPA associated ssDNA is important. Instead, ATR activation is heavily dependent on the existence of all the proteins previously described, that colocalize around the site of DNA damage. An experiment where RAD9, ATRIP, and TOPBP1 were overexpressed proved that these proteins alone were enough to activate ATR in the absence of ssDNA, showing their importance in triggering this pathway.

Once ATR is activated, it phosphorylates Chk1, initiating a signal transduction cascade that culminates in cell cycle arrest. It acts to activate Chk1 through a claspin intermediate which binds the two proteins together. This claspin intermediate needs to be phosphorylated at two sites in order to do this job, something that can be carried out by ATR but is most likely under the control of some other kinase. This response, mediated by Chk1, is essential to regulating replication within a cell; through the Chk1-CDC25 pathway, which effects levels of CDC2, this response is thought to reduce the rate of DNA synthesis in the cell and inhibit origin firing during replication.

In addition to its role in activating the DNA damage checkpoint, ATR is thought to function in unperturbed DNA replication. The response is dependent on how much ssDNA accumulates at stalled replication forks. ATR is activated during every S phase, even in normally cycling cells, as it works to monitor replication forks to repair and stop cell cycling when needed. This means that ATR is activated at normal, background levels within all healthy cells. There are many points in the genome that are susceptible to stalling during replication due to complex sequences of DNA or endogenous damage that occurs during the replication. In these cases, ATR works to stabilize the forks so that DNA replication can occur as it should.

ATR is related to a second checkpoint-activating kinase, ATM, which is activated by double strand breaks in DNA or chromatin disruption. ATR has also been shown to work on double strand breaks (DSB), acting a slower response to address the common end resections that occur in DSBs, and thus leave long strands of ssDNA (which then go on to signal ATR). In this circumstance, ATM recruits ATR and they work in partnership to respond to this DNA damage. They are responsible for the "slow" DNA damage response that can eventually trigger p53 in healthy cells and thus lead to cell cycle arrest or apoptosis.

== ATR as an essential protein ==
Mutations in ATR are very uncommon. The total knockout of ATR is responsible for early death of mouse embryos, showing that it is a protein with essential life functions. It is hypothesized that this could be related to its likely activity in stabilizing Okazaki fragments on the lagging strands of DNA during replication, or due to its job stabilizing stalled replication forks, which naturally occur. In this setting, ATR is essential to preventing fork collapse, which would lead to extensive double strand breakage across the genome. The accumulation of these double strand breaks could lead to cell death.

== Clinical significance ==
Mutations in ATR are responsible for Seckel syndrome, a rare human disorder that shares some characteristics with ataxia telangiectasia, which results from ATM mutation.

ATR is also linked to familial cutaneous telangiectasia and cancer syndrome.

== Inhibitors ==
ATR/ChK1 inhibitors can potentiate the effect of DNA cross-linking agents such as cisplatin and nucleoside analogues such as gemcitabine. The first clinical trials using inhibitors of ATR have been initiated by AstraZeneca, preferably in ATM-mutated chronic lymphocytic leukaemia (CLL), prolymphocytic leukaemia (PLL) or B-cell lymphoma patients and by Vertex Pharmaceuticals in advanced solid tumours. ATR provided and exciting point for potential targeting in these solid tumors, as many tumors function through activating the DNA damage response. These tumor cells rely on pathways like ATR to reduce replicative stress within the cancerous cells that are uncontrollably dividing, and thus these same cells could be very susceptible to ATR knockout. In ATR-Seckel mice, after exposure to cancer-causing agents, the damage DNA damage response pathway actually conferred resistance to tumor development (6). After many screens to identify specific ATR inhibitors, currently four made it into phase I or phase II clinical trials since 2013; these include AZD6738, M6620 (VX-970), BAY1895344 (Elimusertib). and M4344 (VX-803) (10). These ATR inhibitors work to help the cell proceed through p53 independent apoptosis, as well as force mitotic entry that leads to mitotic catastrophe.

One study by Flynn et al. found that ATR inhibitors work especially well in cancer cells which rely on the alternative lengthening of telomeres (ALT) pathway. This is due to RPA presence when ALT is being established, which recruits ATR to regulate homologous recombination. This ALT pathway was extremely fragile with ATR inhibition and thus using these inhibitors to target this pathway that keeps cancer cell immortal could provide high specificity to stubborn cancer cells.

Additional examples include:

- Alnodesertib
- Berzosertib
- Camonsertib
- Ceralasertib
- Zedoresertib

== Aging ==
Deficiency of ATR expression in adult mice leads to the appearance of age-related alterations such as hair graying, hair loss, kyphosis (rounded upper back), osteoporosis and thymic involution. Furthermore, there are dramatic reductions with age in tissue-specific stem and progenitor cells, and exhaustion of tissue renewal and homeostatic capacity. There was also an early and permanent loss of spermatogenesis. However, there was no significant increase in tumor risk.

== Seckel syndrome ==
In humans, hypomorphic mutations (partial loss of gene function) in the ATR gene are linked to Seckel syndrome, an autosomal recessive condition characterized by proportionate dwarfism, developmental delay, marked microcephaly, dental malocclusion and thoracic kyphosis. A senile or progeroid appearance has also been frequently noted in Seckel patients. For many years, the mutation found in the two families first diagnosed with Seckel Syndrome were the only mutations known to cause the disease.

In 2012, Ogi and colleagues discovered multiple new mutations that also caused the disease. One form of the disease, which involved mutation in genes encoding the ATRIP partner protein, is considered more severe that the form that was first discovered. This mutation led to severe microcephaly and growth delay, microtia, micrognathia, dental crowding, and skeletal issues (evidenced in unique patellar growth). Sequencing revealed that this ATRIP mutation occurred most likely due to missplicing which led to fragments of the gene without exon 2. The cells also had a nonsense mutation in exon 12 of the ATR gene which led to a truncated ATR protein. Both of these mutations resulted in lower levels of ATR and ATRIP than in wild-type cells, leading to insufficient DNA damage response and the severe form of Seckel Syndrome noted above.

Researchers also found that heterozygous mutations in ATR were responsible for causing Seckel Syndrome. Two novel mutations in one copy of the ATR gene caused under-expression of both ATR and ATRIP.

== Homologous recombinational repair ==
Somatic cells of mice deficient in ATR have a decreased frequency of homologous recombination and an increased level of chromosomal damage. This finding implies that ATR is required for homologous recombinational repair of endogenous DNA damage.

== Drosophila mitosis and meiosis ==
Mei-41 is the Drosophila ortholog of ATR. During mitosis in Drosophila DNA damages caused by exogenous agents are repaired by a homologous recombination process that depends on mei-41(ATR). Mutants defective in mei-41(ATR) have increased sensitivity to killing by exposure to the DNA damaging agents UV , and methyl methanesulfonate. Deficiency of mei-41(ATR) also causes reduced spontaneous allelic recombination (crossing over) during meiosis suggesting that wild-type mei-41(ATR) is employed in recombinational repair of spontaneous DNA damages during meiosis.

== Interactions ==
Ataxia telangiectasia and Rad3-related protein has been shown to interact with:

- BRCA1,
- CHD4,
- HDAC2,
- MSH2,
- P53
- RAD17, and
- RHEB.

== See also ==
- Ceralasertib, investigational new drug
