= Mitochondrial replacement therapy =

Special form of in vitro fertilisation

- Other names: Mitochondrial donation
- MeSH: D000069321

Mitochondrial replacement therapy (MRT), sometimes called mitochondrial donation, is the replacement of mitochondria in one or more cells to prevent or ameliorate disease. MRT originated as a special form of in vitro fertilisation in which some or all of the future baby's mitochondrial DNA (mtDNA) comes from a third party. This technique is used in cases when mothers carry genes for mitochondrial diseases. The therapy is approved for use in the United Kingdom and Australia. Eight babies have been born using MRT in the UK as of July 2025. A second application is to use autologous mitochondria to replace mitochondria in damaged tissue to restore the tissue to a functional state. This has been used in clinical research in the United States to treat cardiac-compromised newborns.

== Medical uses ==
=== In vitro fertilisation ===
Mitochondrial replacement therapy has been used to prevent the transmission of mitochondrial diseases from mother to child. In the UK it could only be performed in clinics licensed by the Human Fertilisation and Embryology Authority (HFEA), only for people individually approved by the HFEA, for whom preimplantation genetic diagnosis is unlikely to be helpful, and only with informed consent – given that the risks and benefits are not well understood.

Relevant mutations are found in about 0.5% of the population. Disease affects a much smaller proportion of the population – around one in 5000 individuals, 0.02% – because cells contain many mitochondria and only some carry mutations. The proportion of the cell's mitochondria affected needs to reach a threshold in order to affect the entire cell; and many cells need to be affected for the person to show disease.

The average number of births per year among women at risk for transmitting mtDNA disease is estimated as approximately 150 in the United Kingdom and 800 in the United States.

Where both legal and feasible, MRT provides a fourth reproductive option for women who are at risk for transmitting mtDNA disease and who want to prevent transmission. The other three are using an egg from another woman, adoption, or childlessness.

=== Tissue function ===
Autologous mitochondria extracted from healthy tissue and supplied to damaged tissue has been used to treat cardiac-compromised newborns. Alternatives to the approach include use of an extracorporeal membrane oxygenator (ECMO) or tissue or organ transplantation.

== Techniques ==
In vitro fertilization involves removing eggs from a woman, collecting sperm from a man, fertilizing the egg with the sperm, allowing the fertilized egg to form a blastocyst, and then transferring the blastocyst into the uterus. MRT involves an additional egg from a third person, and manipulation of both the recipient egg and the donor egg.

As of 2016 there were three MRT techniques in use: maternal spindle transfer (MST); pronuclear transfer (PNT); and the newest technique, polar body transfer (PBT). The original technique, cytoplastic transfer, in which mitochondria-containing cytoplasm taken from a donor egg is simply injected into the recipient egg, is no longer used. The UK Parliament only approved the use of two techniques -maternal spindle transfer and pronuclear transfer - for mitichondrial replacement in 2015.

=== Maternal spindle transfer ===
Diagram of the meiotic phases, showing how the chromosomes look in metaphase II

In maternal spindle transfer, an oocyte is removed from the recipient, and when it is in the metaphase II stage of cell division, the spindle-chromosome complex is removed; some of the cytoplasm comes with it, so some mitochondria are likely to be included. The spindle-chromosome complex is inserted into a donor oocyte from which the nucleus has already been removed. This egg is fertilized with sperm and allowed to form a blastocyst, which can then be investigated with preimplantation genetic diagnosis to check for mitochondrial mutations, prior to being implanted in the recipient's uterus.

=== Pronuclear transfer ===
In pronuclear transfer, an oocyte is removed from the recipient and fertilized with sperm. The donor oocyte is fertilized with sperm from the same person. The male and female pronuclei are removed from each fertilized egg prior to their fusing, and the pronuclei from the recipient's fertilized egg are inserted into the fertilized egg from the donor. As with MST, a small amount of cytoplasm from the recipient egg may be transferred, and as with MST, the fertilized egg is allowed to form a blastocyst, which can then be investigated with preimplantation genetic diagnosis to check for mitochondrial mutations before being implanted in the recipient's uterus.

=== Polar body transfer ===
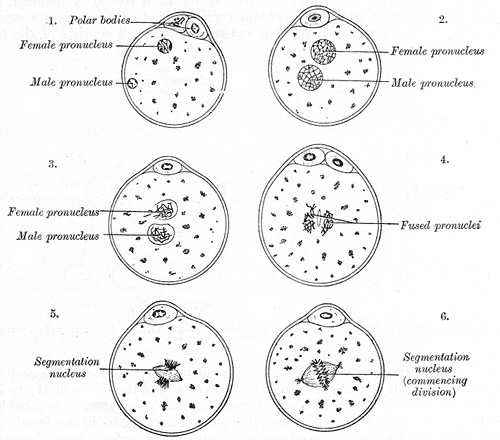
The process of fertilization in the ovum of a mouse, showing pronuclei.

In polar body transfer, a polar body (a small cell with very little cytoplasm that is created when an egg cell divides) from the recipient is used in its entirety, instead of using nuclear material extracted from the recipient's normal egg; this can be used in either MST or PNT. This technique was first published in 2014 and as of 2015 it had not been consistently replicated, but is considered promising as there is a greatly reduced chance for transmitting mitochondria from the recipient because polar bodies contain very few mitochondria, and it does not involve extracting material from the recipient's egg.

Diagram showing the creation of polar bodies.

=== Cytoplasmic transfer ===
Cytoplasmic transfer was originally developed in the 1980s in the course of basic research conducted with mice to study the role that parts of the cell outside of the nucleus played in embryonic development. In this technique, cytoplasm, including proteins, messenger RNA (mRNA), mitochondria and other organelles, is taken from a donor egg and injected into the recipient egg, resulting in a mixture of mitochondrial genetic material. This technique started to be used in the late 1990s to "boost" the eggs of older women who were having problems conceiving and led to the birth of about 30 babies. Concerns were raised that the mixture of genetic material and proteins could cause problems with respect to epigenetic clashes, or differences in the ability of the recipient and donor materials to effect the development process, or due to the injection of the donor material. After three children born through the technique were found to have developmental disorders (two cases of Turner's syndrome and one case of pervasive developmental disorder (an autism spectrum disorder), the FDA banned the procedure until a clinical trial could prove its safety. As of 2015 that study had not been conducted, but the procedure was in use in other countries.

A related approach uses autologous mitochondria taken from healthy tissue to replace the mitochondria in damaged tissue. Transfer techniques include direct injection into damaged tissue and injection into vessels that supply blood to the tissue.

== Risks ==
Assisted reproduction via MRT involves preimplantation genetic screening of the mother, preimplantation genetic diagnosis after the egg is fertilized, and in vitro fertilization. It has all the risks of those procedures.

In addition, both procedures used in MRT entail their own risks. On one level, the procedures physically disrupt two oocytes, removing nuclear genetic material from the recipient egg or fertilized egg and inserting the nuclear genetic material into the donor unfertilized or fertilized egg; the manipulations for both procedures may cause various forms of damage that were not well understood as of 2016.

Maternal mitochondria will be carried over to the donor egg; as of 2016 it was estimated that using techniques current in the UK, maternal mitochondria will comprise only around 2% or less of mitochondria in the resulting egg, a level that was considered safe by the HFEA and within the limits of mitochondrial variation that most people have.

Because MRT procedures involve actions at precise times during egg development and fertilization, and involves manipulating eggs, there is a risk that eggs may mature abnormally or that fertilization may happen abnormally; as of 2016 the HFEA judged that laboratory techniques in the UK had been well enough developed to manage these risks to proceed cautiously with making MRT available.

Because mitochondria in the final egg will come from a third party, different from the two parties whose DNA is in the nucleus, and because nuclear DNA encodes genes that make some of the proteins and mRNA used by mitochondria, there is a theoretical risk of adverse "mito–nuclear" interactions. While this theoretical risk could possibly be managed by attempting to match the haplotype of the donor and the recipient, as of 2016 there was no evidence that this is an actual risk.

Because MRT is a relatively new technology, there are concerns that it is not yet safe for public use as there have been limited studies that used MRT in large animal models.

Finally, there is a risk of epigenetic modification to DNA in the nucleus and mitochondria, caused by the procedure itself or by mito–nuclear interactions. As of 2016 these risks appeared to be minimal but were being monitored by long-term study of children born from the procedure.

== History ==
In the United States in 1996 embryologist Jacques Cohen and others at the Institute for Reproductive Medicine and Science, Saint Barnabas Medical Center in Livingston, New Jersey first used cytoplasmic transfer in a human assisted reproduction procedure. In 1997 the first baby was born using this procedure. In 2001, Cohen and others reported that ten single babies, twins, and a quadruplet at his New Jersey clinic and a further six children in Israel had been born using his technique. Using modifications of his procedure, a baby had been born at Eastern Virginia Medical School, five children at the Lee Women's Hospital Infertility Clinic in Taichung, Taiwan. twins in Naples, Italy and a twins in India. In total as of 2016, 30–50 children worldwide had been reported to have been born using cytoplasmic transfer.

In 2002, the US Food and Drug Administration (FDA) asked a Biological Response Modifiers Advisory Committee Meeting to advise on the technique of cytoplasmic transfer to treat infertility. This committee felt that there were risks at the time of inadvertent transfer of chromosomes and enhanced survival of abnormal embryos. The FDA informed clinics that they considered the cytoplasmic transfer technique as a new treatment, and, as such, it would require an Investigational New Drug (IND) application. Cohen's clinic started the pre-IND application, but the clinic then went private, funding for the application dried up, the application was abandoned, the research team disbanded, and the cytoplasmic transfer procedure fell out of favor. In 2016, 12 (out of the 13) parents of children born using cytoplasmic transfer at the Saint Barnabas Center participated in a limited follow-up inquiry via online questionnaire. Children whose ages then were 13–18 reported no major problems.

In 2009, a team in Japan published studies of mitochondrial donation. In the same year, a team led by scientists at Oregon Health & Science University published results of mitochondrial donation in monkeys; that team published an update reporting on the health of the monkeys born with the technique, as well as further work it had done on human embryos.

Human trials in 2010 by a team in Newcastle University and Newcastle Fertility Centre were successful in reducing transmission of mtDNA. The results of the study found the mean mtDNA carried over was on average under 2% in the experimental embryos. This was true for both the MI-SCC and PN transfer methods of MTR. This research did not extend past the blastocyst stage because of ethical concerns, and there are still concerns about whether results retrieved from the blastocyst stage are viable representations of whole embryos. Because of these speculations and to further the viability of MTR as a safe and effective technique, further research and clinical trials would need to be initiated to test the efficacy of MTR in the long term in human patients.

=== Developments in the United Kingdom using MRT to prevent transmission of mitochondrial disease ===
In the United Kingdom, following animal experiments and the recommendations of a government commissioned expert committee, the Human Fertilisation and Embryology (Research Purposes) Regulations were passed in 2001 regulating and allowing research into human embryos. In 2004, Newcastle University applied for a license to develop pronuclear transfer to avoid the transmission of mitochondrial diseases, and was granted the license in 2005. Following further research by Newcastle and the Wellcome Trust, scientific review, public consultations, and debate, the UK government recommended that mitochondrial donation be legalized in 2013. In 2015 parliament passed the Human Fertilisation and Embryology (Mitochondrial Donation) Regulations, which came into force on 29 October 2015, making human mitochondrial donation legal in the UK. The Human Fertilisation and Embryology Authority (HFEA) was authorized to license and regulate medical centers which wanted to use human mitochondrial donation. In February 2016, the US National Academy of Sciences issued a report describing technologies then current and the surrounding ethical issues.

The HFEA Safety Committee issued its fourth report in November 2016 recommending procedures under which HFEA should authorize MRT, the HFEA issued their regulations in December 2016 and granted their first license (to Newcastle Fertility Centre; Newcastle upon Tyne Hospital NHS Foundation Trust led by Dr Jane Stewart as Person Responsible to the HFEA) in March 2017. Between August 2017 and January 2019, the HFEA received 15 requests from women to undergo MRT, of which 14 were granted.

In July 2025 it was announced that 22 patients had taken part in a mitichondrial replacement trial in the UK. Eight babies (including one set of identical twins) had been born using the pronuclear transfer procedure with one pregnancy still ongoing. The babies showed little or no signs of mitochondrial disease which would otherwise have been passed down from their mothers.

Professor Douglass Turnbull, the driving force behind mitochondrial research at Newcastle University, was awarded a knighthood in 2016 and the Buchanan Medal by the Royal Society in 2020.

=== Australian developments on the use of MRT to prevent mitochondrial disease transmission ===
In June 2018 Australian Senate's Senate Community Affairs References Committee recommended a move towards legalising MRT, and in July 2018 the Australian senate endorsed it. Research and clinical applications of MRT were overseen by laws made by federal and state governments. State laws were, for the most part, consistent with federal law. In all states, legislation prohibited the use of MRT techniques in the clinic, and except for Western Australia, research on a limited range of MRT was permissible up to day 14 of embryo development, subject to a license being granted. In 2010, the Hon. Mark Butler MP, then Federal Minister for Mental Health and Ageing, had appointed an independent committee to review the two relevant acts: the Prohibition of Human Cloning for Reproduction Act 2002 and the Research Involving Human Embryos Act 2002. The committee's report, released in July 2011, recommended the existing legislation remain unchanged. The Australian National Health and Medical Research Council issued two reports on legalising MRT in June 2020.

In 2022, Maeve's Law was passed by the Australian Parliament, legalising MRT under a specified mitochondrial donation licence for research and training, and in clinical settings (Maeve was a Melbourne girl who had severe mitochondrial disease). In July 2025 it was forecast that the first MRT clinical trial in Australia would start in the second half of 2026.

=== MRT to help with infertility ===
In 2016, John Zhang and a mixed team of scientists from Mexico and New York used the spindle transfer technique to help a Jordanian woman to give birth to a baby boy. The mother had Leigh disease and already had four miscarriages and two children who had died of the disease.

In August 2017, in a letter to two clinics, including Zhang's, the FDA warned that the technique should not be marketed in the U.S.

In August and October 2017 the British HFEA authorized MRT for two women who had a genetic mutation in their mitichondria that causes myoclonic epilepsy with ragged red fibers.

In June 2018 Valery Zukin, director of the Nadiya clinic in Kyiv, Ukraine, reported that doctors there had used the pronuclear transfer method of MRT to help four women give birth (three boys and a girl) and three women to become pregnant (one from Sweden). The team had 14 failed attempts. In January 2019 it was reported that seven babies had been born using MRT. Treatment of infertility was reported as the reason for the Ukrainian procedures, not for preventing inherited mitichondrial disease. The doctors had first gotten approval from an ethical committee and a review board of the Ukrainian Association of Reproductive Medicine and the Ukrainian Postgraduate Medical Academy, under the auspices of the Ukrainian Ministry of Healthcare; there was no law in Ukraine against MRT. One of the first children, a boy, was born to a 34-year-old woman in January 2017, and genetic test results were reported as normal.

In January 2019, Embryotools, Barcelona, Spain announced that a 32-year-old Greek woman had become pregnant using the spindle transfer technique. MRT was not legal in Spain so they had performed the trial in Greece where there was no law against MRT. They were helped by the Institute of Life in Athens, Greece and had obtained approval from the Greek National Authority of Assisted Reproduction. The pregnant Greek woman had already had four failed IVF cycles and surgery twice for endometriosis. 25 infertile couples took part in a pilot study at the Greek Institute of Life-IASO IVF Center in 2018 to use the spindle transfer technique to achieve pregnancy. Six babies were born in the study and by 2023 (when they were four years old) they were reported to be healthy. In one child, mitochondria from the mother had expanded to 50% by the time the child was born.The mother did not have mitochondrial disease and so the baby was not affected. But the researchers noted MRT might not be completely successful in preventing passage of mitochondrial disease if this happened again.

=== Other uses of MRT ===
In 2018, researchers announced the use of MRT to restore function to heart tissue in cardiac-compromised newborns. The damaged heart cells absorbed mitochondria extracted from healthy tissue and returned to useful activity.

== Society and culture ==
=== Regulations by Country ===
The United Kingdom became the first country to legalize the procedure: the UK's chief medical officer recommended it be legalized in 2013. Parliament passed The Human Fertilisation and Embryology (Mitochondrial Donation) Regulations in 2015, and the regulatory authority published regulations in 2016.

In 2022, the Australian Parliament passed Maeve’s Law, legalising mitochondrial replacement therapy (MRT) under a specific mitochondrial donation licence for both research and training purposes, as well as in clinical applications.

As of February 2016, the United States had no regulations governing mitochondrial donation, and Congress barred the FDA from evaluating any applications that involve implanting modified embryos into a woman.

In China, the 2003 Chinese Ministry of Health guidelines essentially prohibit the use of MRT.

Mexico does not have specific federal legislation regulating assisted reproductive technologies. However, mitochondrial donation is allowed under certain conditions to address unresolved infertility. Some Mexican states prohibit the technique based on local laws that protect life from the moment of fertilization.

Albania’s regulation of mitochondrial donation is unclear. Law 8876/2002 on Reproductive Health governs assisted reproduction but it does not explicitly address the use of mitochondrial donation.

Northern Cyprus has no regulation on MRT.

Singapore was considering whether to permit the MRT in 2018.

A 2018 article in Reproductive Medicine and Society concluded that in 12 countries studied (Albania, Canada, Czech Republic, India, Israel, Italy, Japan, Mexico, Spain, Taiwan, Turkey and the United Arab Emirates) the regulations on MRT were 'insufficiently regulated.'

=== Ethics ===
Despite the promising outcomes of the two techniques, pronuclear transfer and spindle transfer, mitochondrial gene replacement raises ethical and social concerns.

Mitochondrial donation involves modification of the germline, and hence such modifications would be passed on to subsequent generations. Using human embryos for in vitro research is also controversial, as embryos are created specifically for research and egg donors are induced to undergo the procedure by financial compensation.

Mitochondrial donation also has the potential for psychological and emotional impacts on an offspring through an effect on the person's sense of identity. Ethicists question whether the genetic make-up of children born as a result of mitochondrial replacement might affect their emotional well-being when they become aware that they are different from other healthy children conceived from two parents.

Opponents argue that scientists are "playing God" and that children with three genetic parents may suffer both psychological and physical damage.

On the other hand, New York University researcher James Grifo, a critic of the American ban, has argued that society "would never have made the advances in treating infertility that we have if these bans had been imposed 10 years" earlier.

On February 3, 2016, the Institute of Medicine of the National Academies of Sciences, Engineering, and Medicine issued a report, commissioned by the U.S. Food and Drug Administration, addressing whether it is ethically permissible for clinical research into mitochondrial replacement techniques (MRT) to continue. The report, titled Mitochondrial Replacement Techniques: Ethical, Social, and Policy Considerations, analyzes multiple facets of the arguments surrounding MRT and concludes that it is 'ethically permissible' to continue clinical investigations of MRT, so long as certain conditions are met. It recommended that initially the technique should only be used for male embryos to ensure that DNA with potential mitochondrial disease would not be passed on.

In 2018 Carl Zimmer compared the reaction to He Jiankui's human gene editing experiment to the debate over MRT.

== See also ==
- Microchimerism
- Legalising Mitochondrial Donation, a 2018 book about the legalisation of mitochondrial donation in the United Kingdom.
