= Zedoresertib =

Investigational drug

Clinical data
- Other names: Debio 0123

Identifiers
- IUPAC name: 6-(2,6-dichlorophenyl)-8-methyl-2-[3-methyl-4-(1-methylpiperidin-4-yl)anilino]-7H-pyrimido[4,5-d]pyrimidin-5-one
- CAS Number: 2243882-74-6
- PubChem CID: 152206257
- ChemSpider: 115008494
- UNII: M6Q5T59DJQ
- ChEMBL: ChEMBL5555318

Chemical and physical data
- Formula: C_{26}H_{28}Cl_{2}N_{6}O
- Molar mass: 511.45 g·mol^{−1}
- 3D model (JSmol): Interactive image
- SMILES: CC1=C(C=CC(=C1)NC2=NC=C3C(=N2)N(CN(C3=O)C4=C(C=CC=C4Cl)Cl)C)C5CCN(CC5)C
- InChI: InChI=InChI=1S/C26H28Cl2N6O/c1-16-13-18(7-8-19(16)17-9-11-32(2)12-10-17)30-26-29-14-20-24(31-26)33(3)15-34(25(20)35)23-21(27)5-4-6-22(23)28/h4-8,13-14,17H,9-12,15H2,1-3H3,(H,29,30,31); Key:VWHNEYAANMETIA-UHFFFAOYSA-N

Zedoresertib is an investigational new drug that is being evaluated for the treatment of solid tumors. It is a WEE1 kinase inhibitor.
