= Christine Harrison =

Christine Harrison OBE FMedSci
- Education: University of Manchester
- Known for: Cytogenetics
- Scientific career
- Workplaces: Newcastle University; Royal Free Hospital; University of Southampton

Christine Joyce Britch (née Harrison) is a Professor of Childhood Cancer Cytogenetics at Newcastle University. She works on acute leukemia and used cytogenetics to optimise treatment protocols.

== Early life and education ==
Harrison attended an all girls school, where she was encouraged to become a nurse or a teacher. Harrison went to work at GlaxoSmithKline, before returning to education and securing her A-Levels. She was appointed as a research technician at the Paterson Institute for Cancer Research. She was encouraged to attend university, and studied zoology at the University of Manchester. She remained there for her postgraduate studies, and earned a PhD in cell biology in 1978. During her postgraduate degree Harrison became interested in cytogenetics.

== Research and career ==
In the 1980s Harrison established the Oncology Cytogenetics Service at the Christie Hospital in Manchester. She subsequently held posts at the Royal Free Hospital and University of Southampton. In 2001 Harrison was awarded a £1.7 million grant to investigate the genetic causes of childhood leukaemia. She identified that possession of the Philadelphia chromosome can make it more likely that children will be diagnosed with leukaemia. She has continued to search for new measures of prognosis, and found that the level of minimal residual disease can be a reliable predictor of outcome. Her research has contributed to the increased survival rate (up to 90 %) of children with acute lymphoblastic leukaemia.

Harrison works with scientists around the world to identify the genetic causes of leukaemia and treatment resistance. She has gone beyond whole genome sequencing to study the 5 – 10 % of the genome which is uncharted. Harrison has made several discoveries of abnormal genes, that can help in diagnosis and help doctors personalise healthcare. She collects data from acute leukaemia clinical trials, studying . She identified that a chromosome abnormality known as rob(15;21)c increases people's likelihood to develop leukaemia. For patients with this Robertsonian translocation, leukaemia is initiated by chromothripsis; an event which breaks two chromosomes and reconfigures them in a flawed manner. Harrison is investigating new treatments to target leukemia cells.

Since 2008 Harrison has served as a Professor of Cytogenetics at Newcastle University. Harrison serves on the research funding committee of Bloodwise.

=== Awards and honours ===
Her awards and honours include;

- 2013 Elected to the Academy of Medical Sciences
- 2025 New Years Honours - OBE

=== Selected publications ===
- Harrison, Christine (1998). "The Importance of Diagnostic Cytogenetics on Outcome in AML: Analysis of 1,612 Patients Entered Into the MRC AML 10 Trial". Blood. 92 (7): 2322–2333. doi:10.1182/blood.V92.7.2322.
- Christine, Harrison (2001). "The predictive value of hierarchical cytogenetic classification in older adults with acute myeloid leukemia (AML): analysis of 1065 patients entered into the United Kingdom Medical Research Council AML11 trial". Blood. 98 (5): 1312–1320. doi:10.1182/blood.V98.5.1312. PMID 11520776.
- Harriso, Christine (2007). "Karyotype is an independent prognostic factor in adult acute lymphoblastic leukemia (ALL): analysis of cytogenetic data from patients treated on the Medical Research Council (MRC) UKALLXII/Eastern Cooperative Oncology Group (ECOG) 2993 trial". Blood. 109 (8): 3189–3197. doi:10.1182/blood-2006-10-051912. PMID 17170120.
