= Berzosertib =

Chemical compound

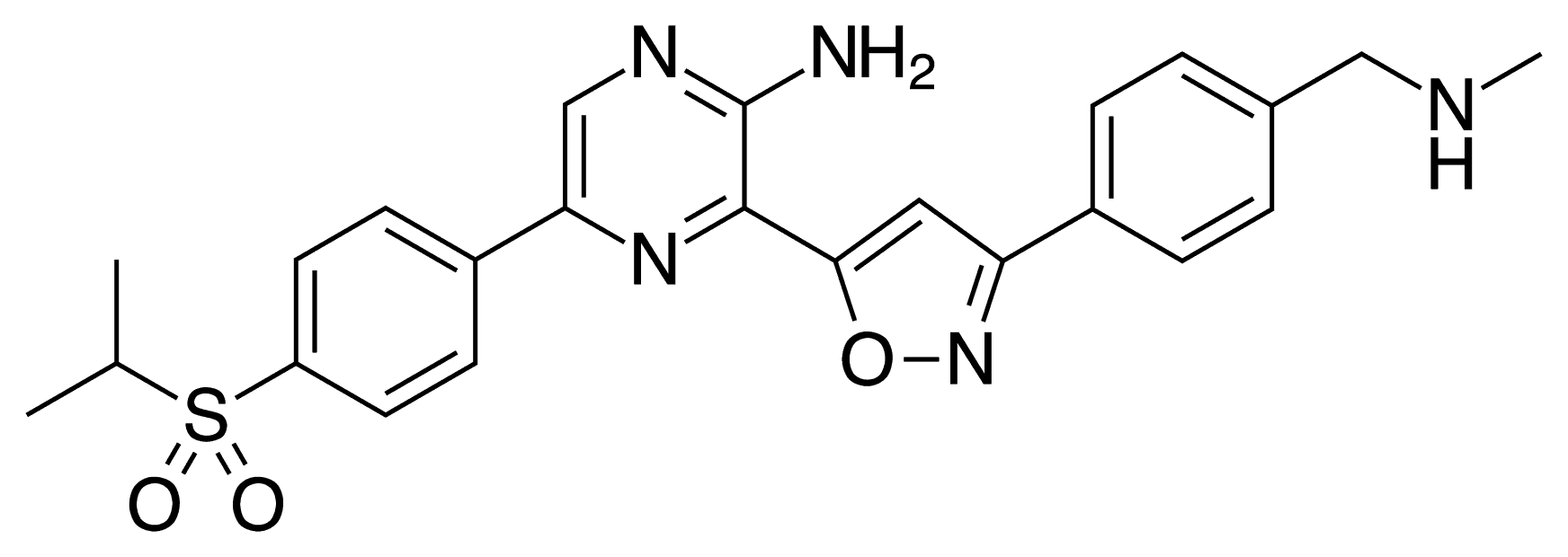

Clinical data
- ATC code: None

Identifiers
- IUPAC name: 3-[3-[4-(methylaminomethyl)phenyl]-5-isoxazolyl]-5-(4-propan-2-ylsulfonylphenyl)-2-pyrazinamine
- CAS Number: 1232416-25-9
- PubChem CID: 59472121
- DrugBank: DB11794
- ChemSpider: 30773968
- UNII: L423PRV3V3
- KEGG: D11148
- ChEBI: CHEBI:131166
- CompTox Dashboard (EPA): DTXSID601025940

Chemical and physical data
- Formula: C_{24}H_{25}N_{5}O_{3}S
- Molar mass: 463.56 g·mol^{−1}
- 3D model (JSmol): Interactive image
- SMILES: CC(C)S(=O)(=O)C1=CC=C(C=C1)C2=CN=C(C(=N2)C3=CC(=NO3)C4=CC=C(C=C4)CNC)N
- InChI: InChI=1S/C24H25N5O3S/c1-15(2)33(30,31)19-10-8-18(9-11-19)21-14-27-24(25)23(28-21)22-12-20(29-32-22)17-6-4-16(5-7-17)13-26-3/h4-12,14-15,26H,13H2,1-3H3,(H2,25,27); Key:JZCWLJDSIRUGIN-UHFFFAOYSA-N

Berzosertib (VE-822, VX-970, M6620) is a drug originally invented by Vertex Pharmaceuticals and licensed to Merck KGaA, Darmstadt, Germany, for development. It acts as a potent inhibitor of the enzyme ataxia telangiectasia and Rad3 related (ATR) and with lower potency as an inhibitor of ATM serine/threonine kinase (ATM). These enzymes are both involved in detecting DNA damage as part of cell cycle checkpoints during cell division. By inhibiting their activity, berzosertib interferes with the ability of rapidly dividing cells to detect damage to DNA, and this makes it useful as a potential treatment for some forms of cancer by causing accumulation of DNA damage in the cancer cells and thus reducing their viability. It has progressed furthest in trials for the treatment of ovarian cancer, though also shows activity against numerous other cancer types.

Phase 1 trial results show promising results in the first clinical trial of the drug class. The new study, designed to test the drug's safety, found that half of patients given the new drug either alone or with platinum chemotherapy saw their cancer stop growing, and two patients saw their tumors shrink or disappear completely.

In a UCLA-led study, berzosertib showed promise in treating COVID-19.
