= Douglass Turnbull =

British neurologist

Sir Douglass Turnbull FRS FMedSci
- Education: Newcastle University
- Awards: Knight Bachelor; Jean Hunter Prize
- Scientific career
- Fields: Mitochondrial donation; Mitochondrial diseases
- Workplaces: Wellcome Trust Centre for Mitochondrial Research; Newcastle University
- Thesis: Mitochondrial cytopathies: clinical and experimental studies (1983)
- Website: www.newcastle-mitochondria.com/portfolio/professor-doug-turnbull

Sir Douglass Matthew Turnbull is professor of neurology at Newcastle University, an honorary consultant neurologist at Newcastle upon Tyne Hospitals NHS Foundation Trust and a director of the Wellcome Trust Centre for Mitochondrial Research.

== Education ==
Turnbull was educated at Newcastle University, where he was awarded a Bachelor of Medicine, Bachelor of Surgery and qualifying as a junior doctor. He was subsequently awarded a PhD for research investigating mitochondrial cytopathies.

== Research ==
Turnbull's research investigates techniques for improving the lives of patients with mitochondrial disease. As of 2016 he has supervised 35 successful PhD students to completion and is currently supervising 10 PhD students in progress. His most highly cited research has been published in world leading peer reviewed scientific journals such as Nature, Nature Genetics, Nature Reviews Genetics, the American Journal of Human Genetics, and the Journal of Clinical Investigation.

His research has been funded by the Wellcome Trust, the Biotechnology and Biological Sciences Research Council (BBSRC) and the Medical Research Council (MRC).

== Awards and honours ==
Turnbull delivered the Goulstonian Lectures in 1992 and was awarded the Jean Hunter Prize in 2003, both by the Royal College of Physicians. He was elected a Fellow of the Academy of Medical Sciences in 2004.

Turnbull was knighted in the 2016 Birthday Honours. According to the BBC, his knighthood was awarded for "creating a groundbreaking IVF technique which prevents disabling genetic disorders from being passed on to future generations". This technique uses mitochondrial donation, also known as "three-person babies".

Turnbull was awarded the Buchanan Medal for outstanding contributions to biomedicine particularly in relation to mitochondrial disease, including the development of a method to prevent their transmission.
