= Nutritional anemia =

Anemia caused by a nutritional disorder

- Specialty: Hematology
- Symptoms: Feeling tired, shortness of breath, pale skin, lightheadedness, fast heart rate, chest pain, burning or numbness, and depression
- Causes: Nutritional disorder
- Diagnostic method: Complete blood count (CBC); grouping and crosshatching; serum for vitamin B12 diagnosis; bone marrow aspiration; history and physical examination

Anemia is a deficiency in the size or number of red blood cells or in the amount of hemoglobin they contain. This deficiency limits the exchange of O_{2} and CO_{2} between the blood and the tissue cells. Globally, young children, women, and older adults are at the highest risk of developing anemia. Anemia can be classified based on different parameters; one classification depends on whether it is related to nutrition or not, so there are two types: nutritional anemia and non-nutritional anemia. Nutritional anemia refers to anemia that can be directly attributed to nutritional disorders or deficiencies. Examples include iron deficiency anemia and pernicious anemia. It is often discussed in a pediatric context.

According to the World Health Organization, a hemoglobin concentration below 110 g/L for children under 5 years of age and pregnant women, and below 130 g/L for men indicates anemia. Hemoglobin is a blood protein that transports oxygen to the cells of the body. Without oxygen, the human body cannot undergo respiration and create Adenosine triphosphate, thereby depriving cells of energy.

Nutritional anemia can be caused by a lack of iron, protein, vitamin B12, and other vitamins and minerals that are needed for the formation of hemoglobin. However, iron deficiency anemia is the most common nutritional disorder.

Signs of severe anemia include cyanosis, jaundice, and easy bruising. In addition, anemic patients may experience difficulties with memory and concentration, fatigue, lightheadedness, sensitivity to temperature, low energy levels, shortness of breath, and pale skin. Symptoms of severe or rapid-onset anemia are very dangerous as the body is unable to adjust to the lack of hemoglobin potentially resulting in shock and death. Mild and moderate anemia has symptoms that develop slowly over time.

== Types of nutritional anemia ==
=== Iron deficiency anemia ===
Iron deficiency anemia is the last stage of iron deficiency and it is characterized by the production of small (microcytic) erythrocytes and a diminished level of circulating hemoglobin. It represents the end point of a long period of iron deprivation.

=== Megaloblastic anemia ===
Megaloblastic anemia reflects DNA disturbance which affects the blood cells (erythrocytes, leukocytes, platelets) and the bone marrow, and it is characterized by large and immature blood cells in the bone marrow (macrocytic anemia), mainly caused by both vitamins B9 (Folic Acid) and B12.

=== Protein-energy malnutrition ===
As explained before, hemoglobin is a protein which means that its production requires adequate and enough intake of protein from the diet, but in case of protein-energy malnutrition, hemoglobin will not be produced sufficiently leading to anemia. As a result, there is a reduction in cell mass and thus fewer red blood cells (RBCs) are required to oxygenate the tissue (reduced number of RBCs with a low hemoglobin).

=== Copper deficiency anemia ===
Copper and its associated proteins are essential for adequate hemoglobin formation, iron utilization by developing erythrocytes, and the optimal function of erythrocyte membranes. Specifically, the copper-containing enzyme ceruloplasmin is required to mobilize iron from the body's storage sites. In a state of copper deficiency, this iron cannot be released, resulting in low serum iron and decreased hemoglobin levels—even when overall iron stores are completely normal.

=== Sideroblastic anemia ===
Sideroblastic anemia is an inherited defect of heme synthesis enzyme which results in derangement in the final pathway of heme synthesis and buildup of immature Fe^{-} containing RBCs. It is classified as a microcytic and hypochromic type of anemia and it is nutritional because it is Vitamin B6-responsive.

=== Hemolytic anemia ===
A defect in RBC membranes causes oxidative damage and lysis of the cells. Vitamin E has shown to be protective as it has an antioxidative function.

== Symptoms and signs ==
Symptoms of nutritional anemia can include fatigue and lack of energy. However, if symptoms progress, one may experience shortness of breath, rapid pulse, paleness —especially in the hands, eyelids and fingernails—, swelling of ankles, hair loss, lightheadedness, compulsive and atypical cravings, constipation, depression, muscle twitching, numbness, or burning and chest pain.

Those who have nutritional anemia often show little to no symptoms. Often, symptoms can go undetected as mild forms of the anemia have only minor symptoms.

== Cause ==
Internationally, anemia caused by iron deficiencies is the most common nutritional disorder. It is the only significantly prevalent nutritional deficiency disorder in industrialized countries. In poorer areas, anemia is worsened by infectious diseases such as HIV/AIDS, tuberculosis, hookworm infestation, and malaria. In developing countries, about 40% of preschool children and 50% of pregnant women are estimated to be anemic. Twenty percent of maternal deaths can be contributed to anemia. Health consequences of anemia include poor pregnancy outcomes, impaired cognitive and physical development, increased rate of morbidity, and reduced rate of work in adults.

Nutritional anemia has many different causes, each either nutritional or non-nutritional. Nutritional causes are vitamin and mineral deficiencies and non-nutritional causes include infections. The number one cause of this type of anemia, however, is iron deficiency.

An insufficient intake of iron, Vitamin B12, and folic acid impairs the bone marrow function. The lack of iron within a person's body can also stem from ulcer bacteria. These microbes live in the digestive tract and after many years, cause ulcers in the lining of the stomach or small intestine. Therefore, a high percentage of patients with nutritional anemia may have a potential gastrointestinal disorder that causes chronic blood loss. This is common in immunocompromised, elderly, and diabetic people. High blood loss can also come from the increased loss of blood during menstruation, childbirth, cancers of the intestines, and disorders that hinder the blood's ability to coagulate.

Medications can have adverse effects and cause nutritional anemia as well. Medications that stop the absorption of iron in the gut and cause bleeding from the gut (NSAIDs and Aspirin) can be culprits in the development of this condition. Hydrocortisones and valproic acid are also two drugs that can cause moderate bleeding from the gut. Amoxicillin and phenytoin have the ability to cause a vitamin B12 deficiency.

Other common causes are thyroid disorders, lead toxicity, infectious diseases (e.g., malaria), alcoholism, and vitamin E deficiency.

== Diagnosis ==
- Complete blood count
- Acute phase reactants
- Serum iron studies
- Peripheral blood morphology

== Treatment ==
Treatments for nutritional anemia includes replacement therapy which is used to elevate the low levels of nutrients.[1] Diet improvement is a way to combat nutritional anemia which can be done by taking dietary supplements such as iron, folate, and Vitamin B12.[2] These supplements are available over-the-counter, however, a doctor may prescribe prescription medicine as needed, depending on the patient's health needs.
