= Edmonton protocol =

Medical procedure for type 1 diabetes

- Specialty: Endocrinology

The Edmonton protocol is a method of implantation of pancreatic islets for the treatment of type 1 diabetes mellitus, specifically "brittle" type 1 diabetics prone to hypoglycemic unawareness. The protocol is named for the islet transplantation group at the University of Alberta in the Canadian city of Edmonton, where the protocol was first devised in the late 1990s, and published in The New England Journal of Medicine in July 2000.

== Procedure ==
The Edmonton protocol involves isolating islets from a cadaveric donor pancreas using a mixture of enzymes called Liberase (Roche). Each recipient receives islets from one to as many as three donors. The islets are infused into the patient's portal vein, and are then kept from being destroyed by the recipient's immune system through the use of two immunosuppressants, sirolimus and tacrolimus as well as a monoclonal antibody drug used in transplant patients called daclizumab.

== History ==
Islet isolation and transplantation was pioneered by Paul Lacy throughout the 1960s. He and Walter Ballinger together were able to restore normoglycaemia in diabetic rats following the transplantation of isolated islets into the rodent's livers. Scientists have not yet successfully translated Lacy's success in rodents to humans.

The Edmonton protocol was primarily developed by James Shapiro (transplant surgeon), Jonathan Lakey Ph.D., Dr Edmond Ryan (endocrinologist), Gregory Korbutt Ph.D., Dr. Ellen Toth, Dr. Garth Warnock, Dr. Norman Kneteman, and Ray Rajotte Ph.D., at the University of Alberta Hospital and the Surgical-Medical Research Institute. The first patient was treated using the Edmonton protocol in March 1999. The protocol was first published in the New England Journal of Medicine in July 2000.

The NEJM report was exciting for the diabetes field because the seven patients undergoing the Edmonton protocol remained insulin-independent after an average of 12 months.

== Current review ==
It has been reported that of thirty-six patients transplanted, only sixteen (44%) were insulin-independent after one year; ten (28%) had partial graft function after one year; and ten (28%) had complete graft loss after one year. Insulin independence is not usually sustainable in the long term, but the transplanted islets still function enough to provide protection from severe hypoglycemic episodes and unawareness.

A webpage maintained by the National Institute of Diabetes and Digestive and Kidney Diseases (NIDDK) of the U.S. National Institutes of Health (NIH) indicates that the Collaborative Islet Transplant Registry's 2010 annual report

presented data on 571 patients who received pancreatic islet allo-transplants between 1999 and 2009. ... [A]bout 60 percent of transplant recipients achieved insulin independence—defined as being able to stop insulin injections for at least 14 days—during the year following transplantation.
By the end of the second year, 50 percent of recipients were able to stop taking insulin for at least 14 days. However, long-term insulin independence is difficult to maintain, and eventually most recipients needed to start taking insulin again.
The report identified factors linked to better outcomes for recipients, including
age—35 years or older
lower pre-transplant [serum] triglyceride, or blood fat, levels
lower pre-transplant insulin use
The report noted that even partial function of the transplanted islets can improve blood glucose control and reduce the amount of insulin needed after loss of insulin independence.

A study in 2022 showed that of the 255 patients receiving transplantation between 1999 and 2019, the median graft survival time was 5.9 years. 61% was insulin independent at 1 year after surgery, 32% at 5 years, 20% at 10 years, 11% at 15 years, and 8% at 20 years.

The major problem limiting islet transplantation therapy for type 1 diabetic individuals is the lack of organ donors. Citing the Organ Procurement and Transplantation Network, a NIDDK webpage says that "in 2011 there were about 8,000 deceased organ donors available in the United States. However, only 1,562 pancreases were recovered from donors in 2011. Also, many donated pancreases are not suitable for extracting islets for transplants because they do not meet the selection criteria, and islets are often damaged or destroyed during processing. Therefore, only a small number of islet transplants can be performed each year.

"Since 2000, Several hundred people have received islet transplants, by a year after transplant, 50 - 68% of patients do not need to receive additional insulin, but by five years after the procedure, fewer than 10% of total patients are free of daily insulin supplementation."
