= Cyclin-dependent kinase inhibitor protein =

Protein which inhibits cyclin-dependent kinase

Cyclin-dependent kinase inhibitor
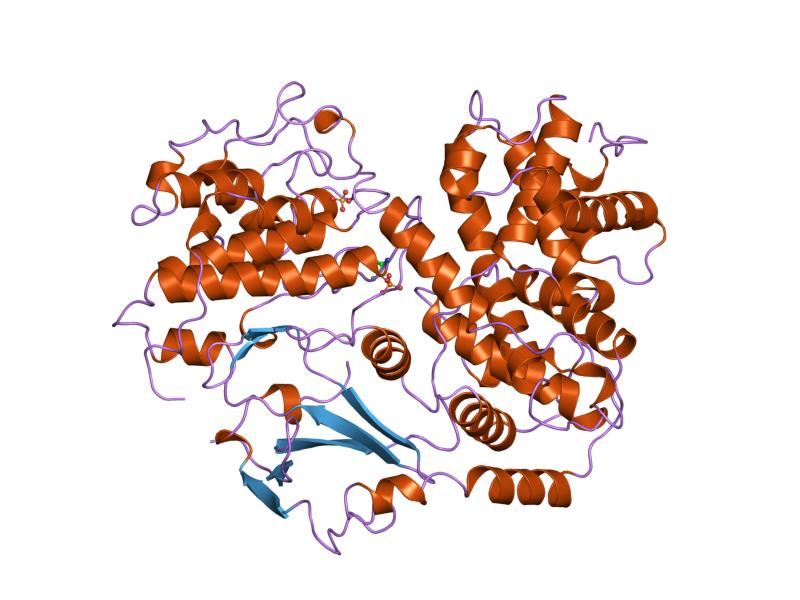
- Structure of the p27Kip1 cyclin-dependent-kinase inhibitor bound to the cyclin A-Cdk2 complex.

Identifiers
- Symbol: CDI
- Pfam: PF02234
- InterPro: IPR003175
- SCOP2: 1jsu / SCOPe / SUPFAM
Available protein structures:
- PDB: 1jsuC:30-80 1h27E:30-35 IPR003175 PF02234 (ECOD; PDBsum)
- AlphaFold: IPR003175; PF02234

A cyclin-dependent kinase inhibitor protein (also known as CKIs, CDIs, or CDKIs) is a protein that inhibits the enzyme cyclin-dependent kinase (CDK) and Cyclin activity by stopping the cell cycle if there are unfavorable conditions, therefore, acting as tumor suppressors. Cell cycle progression is stopped by Cyclin-dependent kinase inhibitor protein at the G1 phase. CKIs are vital proteins within the control system that point out whether the processes of DNA synthesis, mitosis, and cytokines control one another. When a malfunction hinders the successful completion of DNA synthesis in the G1 phase, it triggers a signal that delays or halts the progression to the S phase. Cyclin-dependent kinase inhibitor proteins are essential in the regulation of the cell cycle. If cell mutations surpass the cell cycle checkpoints during cell cycle regulation, it can result in various types of cancer.

== CKI Inactivation Process ==
Cyclin-dependent kinase inhibitor proteins work by inactivating the CDKs through degradation. The typical inactivation mechanism of the CDK/Cyclin complex is based on binding a CDK inhibitor to the CDK cyclin complex and a partial conformational rotation of the CDK. The cyclin is thus forced to release the T loop and detach from the CDK. Then, the CDK inhibitor initiates a small helix into the cleft, blocking the cleft and blocking the active site of the CDK. Eventually, it releases the ATP out of the aperture of the CDK and deactivates it. Cyclin-dependent kinase inhibitor proteins use ATP as a phosphate contributor to phosphorylate serine and threonine residues.

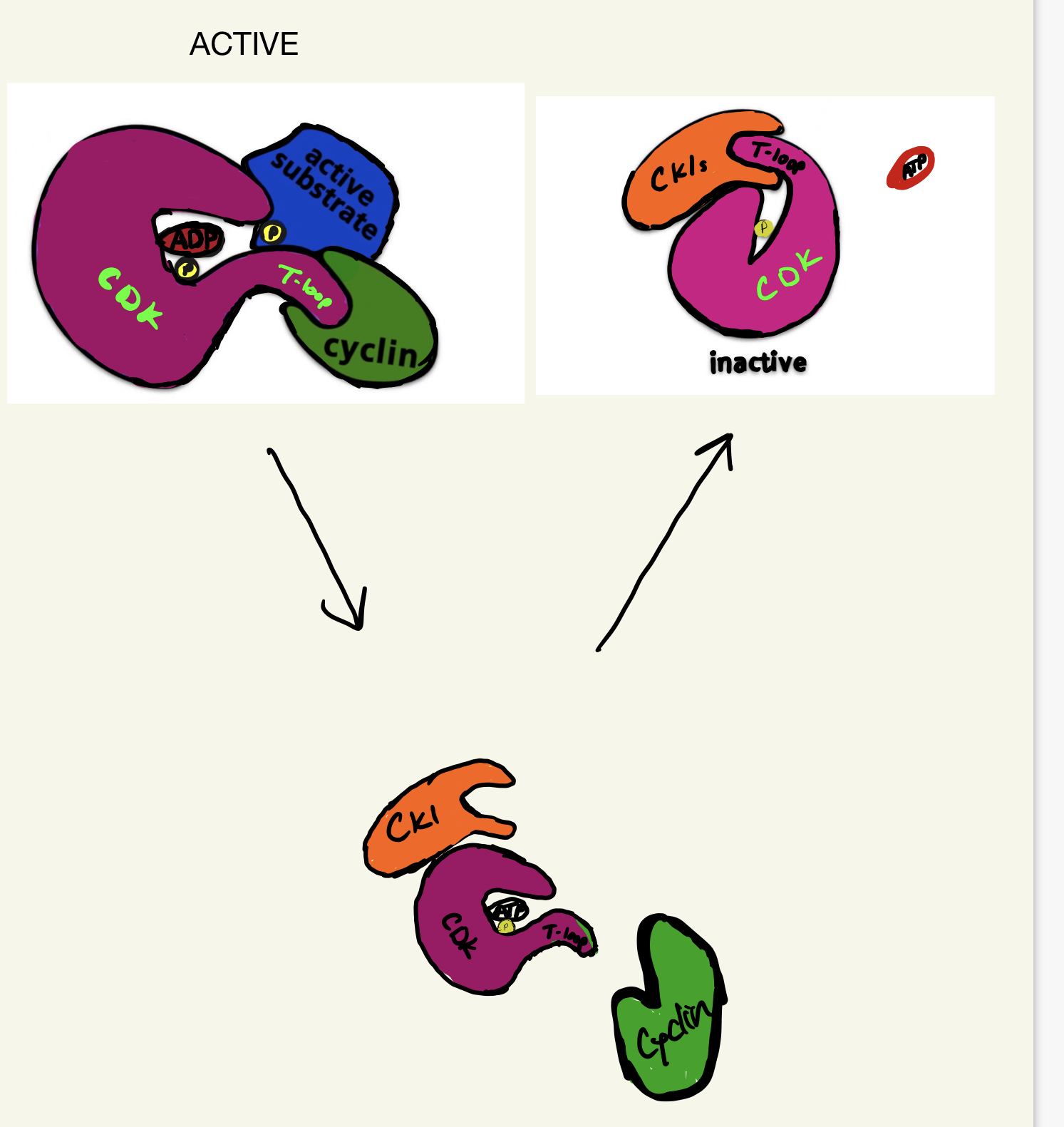
The typical inactivation mechanism of the CDK/ Cyclin complex is based on binding a CDK inhibitor to the CDK cyclin complex and a partial conformational rotation. The cyclin is thus forced to release the T loop and detach from the CDK. The CDK attaches its loop to the CKI stopping the activation of CDK/ Cyclin complex.

Human cells contain many different cyclins that bind to different CDKs. CDKs and cyclins appear and activate at specific cell cycle phases. Seven cyclin-dependent kinase inhibitor proteins have been identified. They are p15, p16, p18, p19, p21, p27, and p57. These cyclin-dependent kinase inhibitor proteins emerge only in their specific cell cycle phase. Each Cyclin/CDK complex is specific to the part of the cell cycle phase. Each CDK and cyclin can be identified based on the location of the cell cycle. CKIs fall into two categories; those that inhibit CDK1, CDK2, and CDK5 and those that inhibit CDK4 and CDK6. These checkpoints' cell cycle blocks at both the G1/S and G2/M checkpoints are consistent with the inhibition profiles of the enzymes.

=== Discovery ===
The discovery of Cyclin-dependent kinase inhibitor proteins in 1990 opened the door in how we think about cell cycle control. It has steered to various other fields of study such as developmental biology, cell biology and cancer research. The discovery of the first CKIs in yeast (Far1) and P21 in mammals has led to research on family of molecules. Further research has demonstrates that Cdks, cyclins and CKIs play essential roles in processes such as transcription, epigenetic regulation, metabolism, stem cell self-renewal, neuronal functions and spermatogenesis.

In mammals, p27, a cyclin-dependent kinase inhibitor protein, helps control CDK activity in G1. Also, the INK4 proteins help stop the G1-CDK activity when they encounter anti-proliferative signals within the environment. CKIs help promote the specific inhibitory signals that contain the cell from entering the S phase. In budding yeast, SIC 1 and Roughex, RUX, in Drosophila possess the same contributions that contribute to the stability of G1 cells. They are expressed in higher numbers in G1 cells to make sure that no S or M CDKs are in the cell.

== Structure ==
In the cyclin-dependent kinase (CDK) family, or CDK, Cyclin, and CKIs, serine/threonine kinases play an integral role in regulating the eukaryotic cell cycle. The structure of CDK2-CyclinA and p27 is determined by crystallography, demonstrating that the inhibitor of p27 stretches at the top of the Cyclin-CDK complex. The amino terminal of p27 has an RXL motif exhibiting a hydrophobic patch of cyclin A. The carboxyl-terminal end of the p27 fragment interacts with the beta sheet of CDKs, causing interference with the structure; p27 slides into the ATP-binding site of CDK2 and inhibits ATP binding.

=== Clinical significance ===
Role in cancer: Cyclin-dependent kinase inhibitor (CKI) mutants are frequent in human cancers. The function of CKI is to stop cell growth when there are mistakes due to DNA damage. Once a cell is stopped at a checkpoint due to DNA damage, either the damage is repaired or the cell is induced to perform apoptosis. However, if CKI's mutations don't stop the cell, Cyclin D is transcribed. It moves into the cytoplasm and eventually activates a specific cyclin-dependent kinase (CDK). The active cyclin/CDK complex then phosphorylates proteins, activates them, and sends the cell into the next phase of the cell cycle. Since the cell with damaged DNA is not stopped, the cell eventually moves out of the G1 checkpoint and prepares for DNA synthesis. When there is uncontrolled cell growth, it can lead to cancer cells due to the inactivation of the CKIs.

== Associated gene and target ==
Protein	Gene	Target
p16	CDKN2A	Cyclin-dependent kinase 4, Cyclin-dependent kinase 6
p15	CDKN2B	Cyclin-dependent kinase 4
p18	CDKN2C	Cyclin-dependent kinase 4, Cyclin-dependent kinase 6
p19	CDKN2D	Cyclin-dependent kinase 4, Cyclin-dependent kinase 6
p21 / WAF1	CDKN1A	Cyclin E1/Cyclin-dependent kinase 2
p27	CDKN1B	Cyclin D3/Cyclin-dependent kinase 4, Cyclin E1/Cyclin-dependent kinase 2
p57	CDKN1C	Cyclin E1/Cyclin-dependent kinase 2
	CDKN3	Cyclin-dependent kinase 2
