= Cell cycle inhibitor =

A cell cycle inhibitor is an agent in pharmacology and cell biology that blocks normal progression of the cell cycle.

Examples of endogenous inhibitors of the cell cycle include:

- CIP/KIP proteins – Inhibitors of a variety of cyclin–cyclin dependent kinase (CDK) complexes
- INK4 proteins – Inhibitors of CDK4 and CDK6

Examples of chemical classes or drugs that can inhibit the cell cycle include:

- Mitotic inhibitors – Agents that disrupt function of the mitotic spindle
- Antimetabolites – Many of which inhibit S phase by impairing synthesis of DNA
- CDK inhibitors
  - Palbociclib – Inhibitor of CDK4 and CDK6
  - Abemaciclib – Inhibitor of CDK4 and CDK6
  - Alvocidib – Inhibitor of CDK9
