= CIP/KIP =

Family of cell cycle regulatory proteins

The CIP/KIP (CDK interacting protein/Kinase inhibitory protein) family is one of two families (CIP/KIP and INK4) of mammalian cyclin-dependent kinase (CDK) inhibitors (CKIs) involved in regulating the cell cycle. The CIP/KIP family is made up of three proteins: p21^{cip1/waf1}, P27^{kip1}, p57^{kip2} These proteins share sequence homology at the N-terminal domain which allows them to bind to both the cyclin and CDK. Their activity primarily involves the binding and inhibition of G1/S- and S-Cdks; however, they have also been shown to play an important role in activating the G1-CDKs CDK4 and CDK6. In addition, more recent work has shown that CIP/KIP family members have a number of CDK-independent roles involving regulation of transcription, apoptosis, and the cytoskeleton.

== Role in cell cycle progression ==
CIP/KIP family proteins bind a wide range of G1/S and S-phase cyclin-CDK complexes including cyclin D-CDK4,6 and cyclin E-, A-CDK2 complexes. Traditionally it was assumed that CIP/KIP proteins played a role in inhibiting all of these complexes; however it was later discovered that CIP/KIP proteins, while inhibiting CDK2 activity, may also activate cyclin D-CDK4,6 activity by facilitating stable binding between cyclin D and CDK4,6.

=== cyclinA-CDK2 regulation ===
The crystal structure of p27 in a complex with cyclinA-CDK2 was published in 1996. The structure shows that p27 interacts with both cyclin A and CDK2. In addition, p27 mimics ATP and inserts itself into the ATP binding site thus preventing ATP binding. This mechanism blocks any kinase activity and prevents downstream hyper-phosphorylation of Rb that allows release of the E2F transcription factor and transcription of cell cycle-related genes.

=== cyclinD-CDK4,6 regulation ===
Cyclin D has low affinity for its CDK. Therefore, it was hypothesized that additional proteins were needed to allow for a stable cyclin D-CDK4,6 complex. Growing evidence has shown that CIP/KIP proteins are involved in this stabilization. The first evidence of this came from the observation that p27 would frequently immunoprecipitate with active cyclin D-CDK4 complexes. Futhurmore, mouse embryonic fibroblasts deficient for p21 and p27 had lower levels of cyclin D1 and immunoprecipitated cyclinD-CDK complexes had no kinase activity. These effects were rescued with reintroduction of p21 and p27, but not reintroduction of cyclin D1 suggesting that CIP/KIP proteins are crucial for cyclin D-CDK activity. In vitro evidence has shown that cyclin D-CDK binding of CIP/KIP is not restricted to p21 and p27 and can also be performed by p57.

=== Model of CIP/KIP G1-S regulation ===
The divergent role of CIP/KIP proteins based on whether they are bound to CDK2 or CDK4,6 has led to a model whereby CIP/KIP proteins bind to and inactivate CDK2 complexes in early G1; however, following production of Cyclin D, CIP/KIP proteins are removed and repurposed towards cyclin D-CDK stabilization. This sequestering then frees up Cyclin A-, E-CDK2 to hyperphosphorylate Rb and promote progression of the cell cycle. This model is supported by the finding that expression of either wild-type or catalytically inactive CDK4 can sequester CIP/KIP proteins resulting in cyclin E-CDK2 activation. This finding suggests that the ability of cyclinD-CDK complexes to sequester CIP/KIP proteins is predominates their inhibitory activity of CDK2.

== Roles outside of cell cycle progression ==
=== Apoptosis ===
CIP/KIP proteins have been shown to regulate apoptosis via a variety of mechanisms. p21 and p27 cleavage are known to promote apoptosis through activation of CDK2 activation. p57 has also been shown to inhibit apoptosis as p57 null mice show a range of developmental defects including cleft palate and a range of intestinal abnormalities associated with increased apoptosis.

CIP/KIP proteins have also been shown to regulate apoptosis via CDK-independent mechanisms. p57 can bind JNK1/SAPK, a stress-related kinase, and block its activity, protecting against JNK1-regulated apoptosis.

=== Transcription ===
CIP/KIP proteins can regulate transcription indirectly through stabilization of cyclinD-CDK and disinhibiting cyclin-CDK2 complexes that are crucial for Rb phosphorylation and release of the E2F transcription factor. CIP/KIP proteins have also been shown to directly bind transcription factors. For example. p27 has been shown to bind to and stabilize Neurogenin-2 promoting differentiation of neural progenitor cells.

=== Cytoskeleton ===
CIP/KIP proteins have previously been shown to inhibit Rho/ROCK/LIMK/Cofilin signaling. In addition, fibroblasts deficient for p27 have reduced motility. p27 deficient fibroblasts also have increased levels of stress fibers and focal adhesions. The role of CIP/KIP proteins in motility has also become particularly of interest in cancer where misregulation of p27 could result in increased proliferation and increased motility which may contribute to more invasive cancers.

== Role in cancer and disease ==
As cyclin-dependent kinase inhibitors, CIP/KIP proteins have been classically viewed as tumor suppressors; however, the exact role of CIP/KIP proteins in cancer progression has been difficult to assess because a complete loss of CIP/KIP function has not been observed in any cancers. However, low-expression p27 has been observed in a wide variety of tumors and is associated with increased tumor aggression. In addition, p27 null mice spontaneously develop tumors in the pituitary gland and are more susceptible to chemical carcinogens or irradiation. In particular, not only the expression of p27, but also the subcellular localization of p27 is thought to play an important role in tumorigenesis. Elevated cytoplasmic localization of p27 has been observed in a number of cancers and has been associated with a poor prognosis. This mislocalization could potentially explain how p27 could simultaneously promote cell cycle progression and increased motility in cancers. A similar model could also be equally true of other CIP/KIP proteins.
