= CDKN2D =

Protein-coding gene in humans

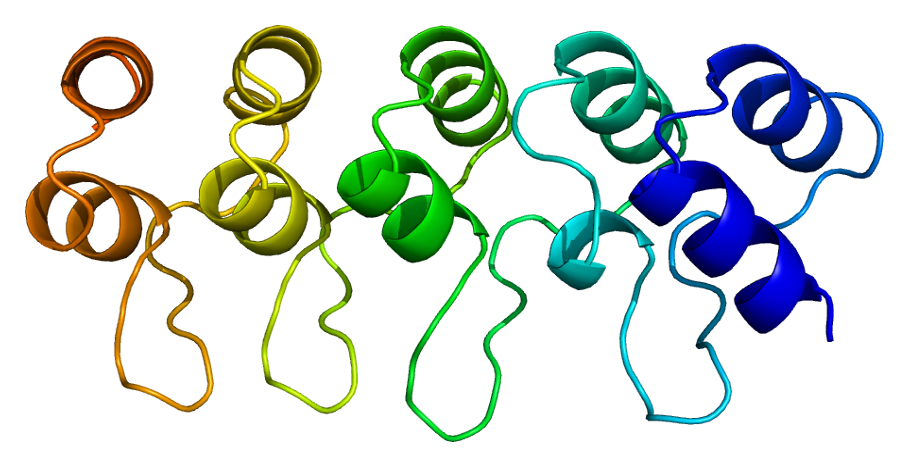

Identifiers
- Aliases: CDKN2D, INK4D, p19, p19-INK4D, cyclin-dependent kinase inhibitor 2D, cyclin dependent kinase inhibitor 2D
- External IDs: OMIM: 600927; MGI: 105387; GeneCards: CDKN2D
Available structures
PDB	Ortholog search: PDBe RCSB
PDB	List of PDB id codes 1BD8, 1BI8

Gene location (Human)
Chr.	Chromosome 19 (human)
Band	19p13.2	Start	10,566,460 bp
Band	19p13.2	End	10,569,059 bp

Gene location (Mouse)
Chr.	Chromosome 9 (mouse)
Band	9|9 A3	Start	21,199,706 bp
Band	9|9 A3	End	21,202,703 bp
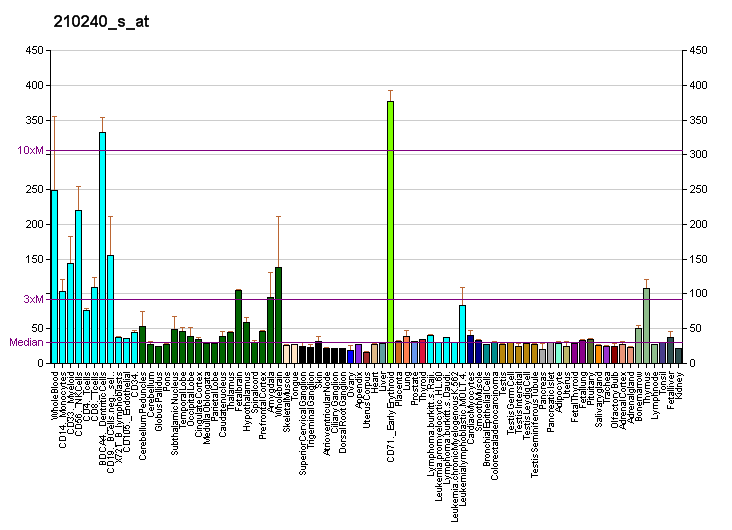
RNA expression pattern
Bgee	Human / Mouse (ortholog); Top expressed in: monocyte; granulocyte; right frontal lobe; cingulate gyrus; anterior cingulate cortex; prefrontal cortex; amygdala; nucleus accumbens; dorsolateral prefrontal cortex; caudate nucleus / Top expressed in: granulocyte; tibiofemoral joint; atrium; thymus; fetal liver hematopoietic progenitor cell; medial ganglionic eminence; saccule; endocardial cushion; human fetus; cingulate gyrus; More reference expression data
BioGPS	More reference expression data
Gene ontology
Molecular function	protein binding; cyclin-dependent protein serine/threonine kinase inhibitor activity; protein kinase binding
Cellular component	cytoplasm; nucleoplasm; nucleus; cytosol; cyclin D2-CDK4 complex
Biological process	DNA synthesis involved in DNA repair; regulation of cyclin-dependent protein serine/threonine kinase activity; negative regulation of cysteine-type endopeptidase activity involved in apoptotic process; response to vitamin D; response to retinoic acid; negative regulation of intrinsic apoptotic signaling pathway in response to DNA damage; negative regulation of cell growth; cell cycle; negative regulation of phosphorylation; response to UV; autophagic cell death; negative regulation of cell population proliferation; hearing; negative regulation of cell cycle G1/S phase transition; G1/S transition of mitotic cell cycle; negative regulation of cyclin-dependent protein serine/threonine kinase activity; negative regulation of G1/S transition of mitotic cell cycle
Sources:Amigo / QuickGO
Orthologs
Databases	NCBI: entry; OMA: entry
Species	Human	Mouse
Entrez	1032	12581
Ensembl	ENSG00000129355	ENSMUSG00000096472
UniProt	P55273	Q60773
RefSeq (mRNA)	NM_079421; NM_001800	NM_009878
RefSeq (protein)	NP_001791; NP_524145	NP_034008
Location (UCSC)	Chr 19: 10.57 – 10.57 Mb	Chr 9: 21.2 – 21.2 Mb
PubMed search
- Wikidata
View/Edit Human	View/Edit Mouse

Cyclin-dependent kinase 4 inhibitor D is an enzyme that in humans is encoded by the CDKN2D gene.

The protein encoded by this gene is a member of the INK4 family of cyclin-dependent kinase inhibitors. This protein has been shown to form a stable complex with CDK4 or CDK6, and prevent the activation of the CDK kinases, thus function as a cell growth regulator that controls cell cycle G1 progression. The abundance of the transcript of this gene was found to oscillate in a cell-cycle dependent manner with the lowest expression at mid G1 and a maximal expression during S phase. The negative regulation of the cell cycle involved in this protein was shown to participate in repressing neuronal proliferation, as well as spermatogenesis. The expression of this gene and its protein product (p19) is observed in neurons with neurofibrillary tangles (NFTs) and it is suggested as a marker for senescent neurons. Two alternatively spliced variants of this gene, which encode an identical protein, have been reported.

Note, this protein should not be confused with p19-ARF (mouse) or the human equivalent p14ARF, which are alternative products of the CDKN2A gene.
