= CDKN2A =

Protein-coding gene in humans

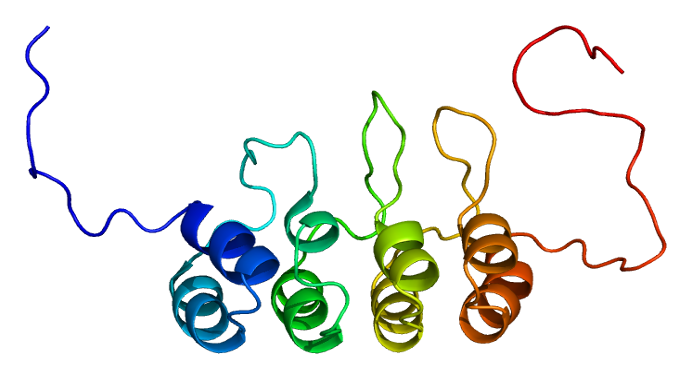

Identifiers
- Aliases: CDKN2A, CDK4I, CDKN2, CMM2, INK4, INK4A, MLM, MTS-1, MTS1, P14, P14ARF, P16, P16-INK4A, P16INK4, P16INK4A, P19, P19ARF, TP16, cyclin-dependent kinase inhibitor 2A, cyclin dependent kinase inhibitor 2A, Genes, p16, ARF.
- External IDs: OMIM: 600160; MGI: 104738; GeneCards: CDKN2A
Available structures
PDB	Ortholog search: PDBe RCSB
PDB	List of PDB id codes 2A5E, 1A5E, 1BI7, 1DC2,%%s1A5E, 1BI7, 1DC2, 2A5E

Gene location (Human)
Chr.	Chromosome 9 (human)
Band	9p21.3	Start	21,967,752 bp
Band	9p21.3	End	21,995,301 bp

Gene location (Mouse)
Chr.	Chromosome 4 (mouse)
Band	4 C4|4 42.15 cM	Start	89,192,708 bp
Band	4 C4|4 42.15 cM	End	89,212,890 bp
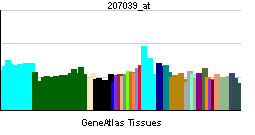

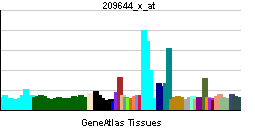

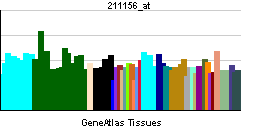
RNA expression pattern
Bgee	Human / Mouse (ortholog); Top expressed in: parotid gland; pituitary gland; testicle; anterior pituitary; subthalamic nucleus; tongue; ventral tegmental area; mucosa of pharynx; superior surface of tongue; external globus pallidus / Top expressed in: yolk sac; stroma of bone marrow; morula; embryo; glossopharyngeal ganglion; endothelial cell of lymphatic vessel; lumbar subsegment of spinal cord; calvaria; greater petrosal nerve; muscle of thigh; More reference expression data
BioGPS	More reference expression data
Gene ontology
Molecular function	NF-kappaB binding; protein binding; cyclin-dependent protein serine/threonine kinase inhibitor activity; protein kinase binding; RNA binding; DNA binding; p53 binding; transcription factor binding; MDM2/MDM4 family protein binding; ubiquitin-protein transferase inhibitor activity; SUMO transferase activity; disordered domain specific binding; ubiquitin ligase inhibitor activity
Cellular component	cytoplasm; cytosol; senescence-associated heterochromatin focus; nucleus; nuclear body; nucleoplasm; nucleolus; mitochondrion; protein-containing complex
Biological process	positive regulation of smooth muscle cell apoptotic process; negative regulation of cyclin-dependent protein serine/threonine kinase activity; replicative senescence; G1 phase; negative regulation of cell-matrix adhesion; cellular senescence; negative regulation of cell growth; positive regulation of cellular senescence; positive regulation of macrophage apoptotic process; cell cycle; Ras protein signal transduction; negative regulation of phosphorylation; negative regulation of transcription, DNA-templated; negative regulation of NF-kappaB transcription factor activity; negative regulation of cell population proliferation; G1/S transition of mitotic cell cycle; negative regulation of G1/S transition of mitotic cell cycle; apoptotic process; regulation of G2/M transition of mitotic cell cycle; regulation of transcription, DNA-templated; regulation of protein stability; negative regulation of immature T cell proliferation in thymus; regulation of protein export from nucleus; negative regulation of protein kinase activity; negative regulation of proteolysis involved in cellular protein catabolic process; protein K63-linked ubiquitination; positive regulation of signal transduction by p53 class mediator; somatic stem cell division; protein stabilization; protein polyubiquitination; positive regulation of protein sumoylation; transcription, DNA-templated; positive regulation of transcription, DNA-templated; autophagy of mitochondrion; apoptotic mitochondrial changes; regulation of protein targeting to mitochondrion; protein destabilization; negative regulation of ubiquitin-protein transferase activity; positive regulation of apoptotic process; rRNA processing; negative regulation of ubiquitin-dependent protein catabolic process; mitochondrial depolarization; positive regulation of DNA damage response, signal transduction by p53 class mediator; negative regulation of B cell proliferation; activation of cysteine-type endopeptidase activity involved in apoptotic process; regulation of apoptotic DNA fragmentation; positive regulation of transcription by RNA polymerase II; positive regulation of protein localization to nucleus; protein sumoylation; positive regulation of gene expression; negative regulation of ubiquitin protein ligase activity; amyloid fibril formation; negative regulation of protein neddylation
Sources:Amigo / QuickGO
Orthologs
Databases	NCBI: entry; OMA: entry
Species	Human	Mouse
Entrez	1029	12578
Ensembl	ENSG00000147889	ENSMUSG00000044303
UniProt	P42771; Q8N726	P51480; Q64364
RefSeq (mRNA)	NM_000077; NM_001195132; NM_058195; NM_058196; NM_058197 NM_001363763	NM_001040654; NM_009877
RefSeq (protein)	NP_000068; NP_001182061; NP_478102; NP_478104; NP_001350692 NP_478102.2	NP_001035744; NP_034007; NP_034007.1
Location (UCSC)	Chr 9: 21.97 – 22 Mb	Chr 4: 89.19 – 89.21 Mb
PubMed search
- Wikidata
View/Edit Human	View/Edit Mouse

CDKN2A, also known as cyclin-dependent kinase inhibitor 2A, is a gene which in humans is located at chromosome 9, band p21.3. It is ubiquitously expressed in many tissues and cell types. The gene codes for two proteins, including the INK4 family member p16 (or p16INK4a) and p14arf. Both act as tumor suppressors by regulating the cell cycle. p16 inhibits cyclin dependent kinases 4 and 6 (CDK4 and CDK6) and thereby activates the retinoblastoma (Rb) family of proteins, which block traversal from G1 to S-phase. p14ARF (known as p19ARF in the mouse) activates the p53 tumor suppressor. Somatic mutations of CDKN2A are common in the majority of human cancers, with estimates that CDKN2A is the second most commonly inactivated gene in cancer after p53. Germline mutations of CDKN2A are associated with familial melanoma, glioblastoma and pancreatic cancer. The CDKN2A gene also contains one of 27 SNPs associated with increased risk of coronary artery disease.

== Structure ==
=== Gene ===
The CDKN2A gene resides on chromosome 9 at the band 9p21 and contains 8 exons. This gene encodes two proteins, p16 and p14ARF, which are transcribed from the same second and third exons but alternative first exons: p16 from exon 1α and ARF from exon 1β. As a result, they are translated from different reading frames and therefore possess completely different amino acid sequences. In addition to p16 and ARF, this gene produces 4 other isoforms through alternative splicing.

=== Proteins ===
==== p16 ====
This protein belongs to the CDKN2 cyclin-dependent kinase inhibitor family. p16 comprises four ankyrin repeats, each spanning a length of 33 amino acid residues and, in the tertiary structure, forming a helix-turn-helix motif. One exception is the second ankyrin repeat, which contains only one helical turn. These four motifs are connected by three loops such that they are oriented perpendicular to the helical axes.

According to its solvent-accessible surface representation, p16 features clustered charged groups on its surface and a pocket located on the right side with a negatively charged left inner wall and a positively charged right inner wall.

==== p14ARF ====
The size of this protein is 14 kDa in humans. Within the N-terminal half of ARF are highly hydrophobic domains that serve as mitochondrial import sequences.

== Function ==
=== P14ARF ===
P14ARF is a central actor of the cell cycle regulation process as it participates to the ARF-MDM2-p53 pathway and the Rb-E2F-1 pathway. It is the physiological inhibitor of MDM2, an E3 ubiquitin ligase controlling the activity and stability of P53, and loss of P14ARF activity may have a similar effect as loss of P53. P14ARF induces cell cycle arrest in G2 phase and subsequent apoptosis in a P53-dependent and P53-independent manner, and thus is regarded as a tumor suppressor. In addition, P14ARF could down-regulate E2F-dependent transcription and plays a role in the control of the G1 to S phase transition as well.

=== P16（INK4A） ===
P16 interacts with Rb and controls the G1 to S transition. It binds to CDK4/6 inhibiting its kinase activity and prevents Rb phosphorylation. Therefore, Rb remains associated with transcription factor E2F1, preventing transcription of E2F1 target genes which are crucial for the G1/S transition. During this process, a feedback loop exists between P16 and Rb, and P16 expression is controlled by Rb. P16/Rb pathway collaborates with the mitogenic signaling cascade for the induction of reactive oxygen species, which activates the protein kinase C delta, leading to an irreversible cell cycle arrest. Thus P16 participates not only in the initiation but also in the maintenance of cellular senescence, as well in tumor suppression. On the other hand, some specific tumors harbor high levels of P16, and its function in limitation of tumorigenic progression has been inactivated via the loss of Rb.

== Clinical relevance ==
In human cancer cell lines derived from various tumor types, a high frequency of genetic and epigenetic alterations (e.g., promoter hyper-methylation, homozygous deletion or mutation) in the CDKN2A gene has been observed. Accordingly, epigenetic/genetic modulation of changes in CDKN2A might be a promising strategy for prevention or therapy of cancer.

The CDKN2A gene is located on the chromosome 9p21 locus, which is intriguing for several reasons. First, this region is well known in cancer genetics as one of the most common sites of deletions leading to hereditary forms of cutaneous melanoma. Second, genome wide association studies have reported a significant association of chromosome 9p21 with coronary artery disease and myocardial infarction as well as the progression of atherosclerosis.

Furthermore, changes in CDKN2A status are highly variable depending on the type of cancer. In addition to skin cancer such as melanoma, changes of CDKN2A have been described in a wide spectrum of cancer types such as gastric lymphoma, Burkitt's lymphoma, head & neck squamous cell carcinoma, glioma, oral cancer, pancreatic adenocarcinoma, non-small cell lung carcinomas, esophageal squamous cell carcinoma, gastric cancer, bladder cancer, osteosarcoma, colorectal cancer, breast cancer, cervical cancer, epithelial ovarian carcinoma, endometrial cancer and prostate cancer.

=== Familial melanoma ===
CDKN2A is made up of four sections of exons – exon 1β, exon 1α, exon 2, and exon 3. These exons are used to create two proteins named p16 and p14ARF. Protein p16, created by exon 1α and exon 2, is responsible for tumor creation of genetic melanoma. When working normally, p16 binds to the cyclin dependent kinases CDK4 to inhibit their ability to create tumors, but when inactivated the suppression no longer occurs. When a mutation occurs in protein p16, it prevents the protein kinase of CDK4, which results in the inactivation of the tumor suppressor gene. This starts the development of melanoma.

Melanoma only occurs in a small proportion of the population. If only two family members have melanoma, there is a 5% chance somebody in the next generation will acquire the mutated gene. Also, there is a 20-40% chance of getting hereditary melanoma in a family if 3 or more people in the past generation had melanoma. For those who carry the hereditary mutated gene CDKN2A, acquiring skin cancer is a lot easier. Those who have the gene are far more likely to get melanoma a second or third time compared to those who don't genetically have this gene. The population that is affected by this mutation has a high familial history of melanoma or atypical moles and birth marks in large numbers, a history of primary melanoma/cancers in general, immunosuppression, skin that burns easily and doesn't tan, freckling, blue eyes, red hair, or a history of blistering. People with these high risk factors are more likely to carry inherited mutations in CDKN2A. For those who have a gene mutation, the severity is also dependent on the environmental surroundings. Out of those who carry the gene, those who express the phenotype and actually developed melanoma have a history of more sun exposure, and light skin compared to those who also had the gene but never actually developed melanoma. This suggests that this gene co-works with ones surrounding environment. If two individuals are selected who carry the CDKN2A mutation, and both genetically have the same probability of acquiring skin cancer, but one is from Australia and the other is from Europe, there is a 58% the European will acquire cancer compared to a 91% chance the Australian will get it. This is because the factors mentioned earlier pertaining to those who are more susceptible to the disease and also dependent on the amount of sunscreen one wears and the UV radiation potency in their environment.

=== Clinical marker ===
A multi-locus genetic risk score study based on a combination of 27 loci, including the CDKN2A gene, identified individuals at increased risk for both incident and recurrent coronary artery disease events, as well as an enhanced clinical benefit from statin therapy. The study was based on a community cohort study (the Malmo Diet and Cancer study) and four additional randomized controlled trials of primary prevention cohorts (JUPITER and ASCOT) and secondary prevention cohorts (CARE and PROVE IT-TIMI 22).

=== Aging ===
Activation of the CDKN2A locus promotes the cellular senescence tumor suppressor mechanism, which is a permanent form of growth arrest. As senescent cells accumulate with aging, expression of CDKN2A increases exponentially with aging in all mammalian species tested to date, and has been argued to serve as a biomarker of physiological age. Notably, a recent survey of cellular senescence induced by multiple treatments to several cell lines does not identify CDKN2A as belonging to a "core signature" of senescence markers.

=== In animals ===
A variant in the CDKN2A locus present in the founder of Bernese mountain dogs around 200 years ago predisposes the breed to histiocytic sarcoma.

== Sources ==
- Irvine M, Philipsz S, Frausto M, Mijatov B, Gallagher SJ, Fung C, Becker TM, Kefford RF, Rizos H (February 2010). "Amino terminal hydrophobic import signals target the p14(ARF) tumor suppressor to the mitochondria". Cell Cycle. 9 (4): 829–39. doi:10.4161/cc.9.4.10785. PMID 20107316.
