= Cyclin D =

Member of the cyclin protein family

cyclin D1
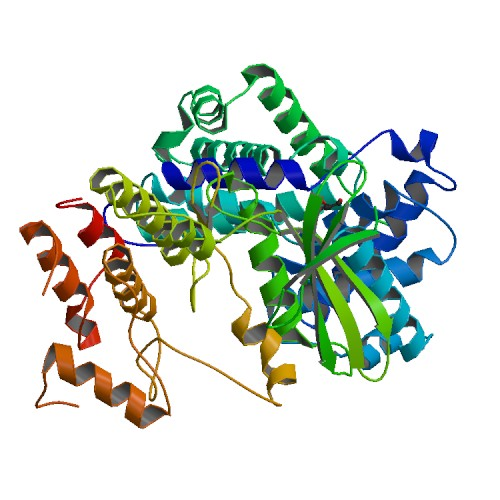
- Crystal structure of human cyclin D1 (blue/green) in complex with cyclin-dependent kinase 4 (yellow/red)

Identifiers
- Symbol: CCND1
- Alt. symbols: BCL1, D11S287E, PRAD1
- NCBI gene: 595
- HGNC: 1582
- OMIM: 168461
- RefSeq: NM_053056
- UniProt: P24385

Other data
- Locus: Chr. 11 q13
Search for
- Structures: Swiss-model
- Domains: InterPro

cyclin D2

Identifiers
- Symbol: CCND2
- NCBI gene: 894
- HGNC: 1583
- OMIM: 123833
- RefSeq: NM_001759
- UniProt: P30279

Other data
- Locus: Chr. 12 p13
Search for
- Structures: Swiss-model
- Domains: InterPro

cyclin D3

Identifiers
- Symbol: CCND3
- NCBI gene: 896
- HGNC: 1585
- OMIM: 123834
- RefSeq: NM_001760
- UniProt: P30281

Other data
- Locus: Chr. 6 p21
Search for
- Structures: Swiss-model
- Domains: InterPro

Cyclin D is a member of the cyclin protein family that is involved in regulating cell cycle progression. The synthesis of cyclin D is initiated during G1 and drives the G1/S phase transition. Cyclin D protein is anywhere from 155 (in zebra mussel) to 477 (in Drosophila) amino acids in length.

Once cells reach a critical cell size (and if no mating partner is present in yeast) and if growth factors and mitogens (for multicellular organism) or nutrients (for unicellular organism) are present, cells enter the cell cycle. In general, all stages of the cell cycle are chronologically separated in humans and are triggered by cyclin-Cdk complexes which are periodically expressed and partially redundant in function. Cyclins are eukaryotic proteins that form holoenzymes with cyclin-dependent protein kinases (Cdk), which they activate. The abundance of cyclins is generally regulated by protein synthesis and degradation through APC/C- and CRL-dependent pathways.

Cyclin D is one of the major cyclins produced in terms of its functional importance. It interacts with four Cdks: Cdk2, 4, 5, and 6. In proliferating cells, cyclin D-Cdk4/6 complex accumulation is of great importance for cell cycle progression. Namely, cyclin D-Cdk4/6 complex partially phosphorylates retinoblastoma tumor suppressor protein (Rb), whose inhibition can induce expression of some genes (for example: cyclin E) important for S phase progression.

Drosophila and many other organisms only have one cyclin D protein. In mice and humans, two more cyclin D proteins have been identified. The three homologues, called cyclin D1, cyclin D2, and cyclin D3 are expressed in most proliferating cells and the relative amounts expressed differ in various cell types.

== Homologues ==
The most studied homologues of cyclin D are found in yeast and viruses.

The yeast homologue of cyclin D, referred to as CLN3, interacts with Cdc28 (cell division control protein) during G1.

In viruses, like Saimiriine herpesvirus 2 (Herpesvirus saimiri) and Human herpesvirus 8 (HHV-8/Kaposi's sarcoma-associated herpesvirus) cyclin D homologues (one member of a chromosome pair) have acquired new functions in order to manipulate the host cell's metabolism to the viruses’ benefit. Viral cyclin D binds human Cdk6 and inhibits Rb by phosphorylating it, resulting in free transcription factors which result in protein transcription that promotes passage through G1 phase of the cell cycle. Other than Rb, viral cyclin D-Cdk6 complex also targets p27^{Kip1}, a Cdk inhibitor of cyclin E and A. In addition, viral cyclin D-Cdk6 is resistant to Cdk inhibitors, such as p21^{CIP1/WAF1} and p16^{INK4a} which in human cells inhibits Cdk4 by preventing it from forming an active complex with cyclin D.

== Structure ==
Cyclin D possesses a tertiary structure similar to other cyclins called the cyclin fold. This contains a core of two compact domains with each having five alpha helices. The first five-helix bundle is a conserved cyclin box, a region of about 100 amino acid residues on all cyclins, which is needed for Cdk binding and activation. The second five-helix bundle is composed of the same arrangement of helices, but the primary sequence of the two subdomains is distinct. All three D-type cyclins (D1, D2, D3) have the same alpha 1 helix hydrophobic patch. However, it is composed of different amino acid residues as the same patch in cyclins E, A, and B.

== Function ==
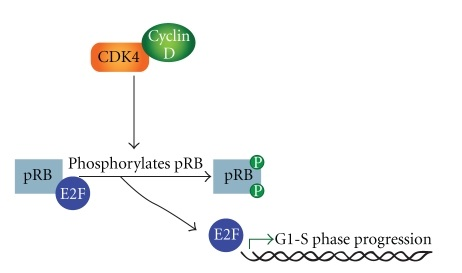
Role of CDK4, cyklin D, Rb and E2F in cell cycle regulation

Growth factors stimulate the Ras/Raf/ERK that induce cyclin D production. One of the members of the pathways, MAPK activates a transcription factor Myc, which alters transcription of genes important in cell cycle, among which is cyclin D. In this way, cyclin D is synthesized as long as the growth factor is present.

Cyclin D levels in proliferating cells are sustained as long as the growth factors are present, a key player for G1/S transition is active cyclin D-Cdk4/6 complexes. Cyclin D has no effect on G1/S transition unless it forms a complex with Cdk 4 or 6.

=== G1/S transition ===
One of the best known substrates of cyclin D/Cdk4 and -6 is the retinoblastoma tumor suppressor protein (Rb). Rb is an important regulator of genes responsible for progression through the cell cycle, in particular through G1/S phase.

One model proposes that cyclin D quantities, and thus cyclin D- Cdk4 and -6 activity, gradually increases during G1 rather than oscillating in a set pattern as do S and M cyclins. This happens in response to sensors of external growth-regulatory signals and cell growth, and Rb is phosphorylated as a result. Rb reduces its binding to E2F and thereby allows E2F-mediated activation of the transcription of cyclin E and cyclin A, which bind to Cdk1 and Cdk2 respectively to create complexes that continue with Rb phosphorylation. Cyclin A and E dependent kinase complexes also function to inhibit the E3 ubiquitin ligase APC/C activating subunit Cdh1 through phosphorylation, which stabilizes substrates such as cyclin A. The coordinated activation of this sequence of interrelated positive feedback loops through cyclins and cyclin dependent kinases drives commitment to cell division to and past the G1/S checkpoint.

Another model proposes that cyclin D levels remain nearly constant through G1. Rb is mono-phosphorylated during early to mid-G1by cyclin D-Cdk4,6, opposing the idea that its activity gradually increases. Cyclin D dependent monophosphorylated Rb still interacts with E2F transcription factors in a way that inhibits transcription of enzymes that drive the G1/S transition. Rather, E2F dependent transcription activity increases when that of Cdk2 increases and hyperphosphorylates Rb towards the end of G1. Rb may not be the only target for cyclin D to promote cell proliferation and progression through the cell cycle. The cyclin D-Cdk4,6, complex, through phosphorylation and inactivation of metabolic enzymes, also influences cell survival. Through close analysis of different Rb-docking helices, a consensus helix sequence motif was identified, which can be utilized to identify potential non-canonical substrates that cyclin D-Cdk4,6 could use to promote proliferation.

=== Docking to Rb ===
RxL- and LxCxE- based docking mutations broadly affect cyclin-Cdk complexes. Mutations of key Rb residues previously observed to be needed for Cdk complex docking interactions result in reduced overall kinase activity towards Rb. The LxCxE binding cleft in the Rb pocket domain, which has been shown to interact with proteins such as cyclin D and viral oncoproteins, has only a marginal 1.7 fold reduction in phosphorylation by cyclin D-Cdk4,6 when removed. Similarly, when the RxL motif, shown to interact with the S phase cyclins E and A, is removed, cyclin D-Cdk4,6 activity has a 4.1 fold reduction. Thus, the RxL- and LxCxE based docking sites have interactions with cyclin D-Cdk4,6 like they do with other cyclins, and removal of them have modest a modest effect in G1 progression.

Cyclin D-Cdk 4,6 complexes target Rb for phosphorylation through docking a C-terminal helix. When the final 37 amino acid residues are truncated, it had previously been shown that Rb phosphorylation levels are reduced and G1 arrest is induced. Kinetic assays have shown that with the same truncation, the reduction of Rb phosphorylation by cyclin D1-Cdk4,6 is 20 fold and Michaelis-Menten constant (Km) is significantly increased. The phosphorylation of Rb by cyclin A-Cdk2, cyclin B-Cdk1, and cyclin E-Cdk2 are unaffected.

The C terminus has a stretch of 21 amino acids with alpha-helix propensity. Deletion of this helix or disruption of it via proline residue substitutions also show a significant reduction in Rb phosphorylation. The orientation of the residues, along with the acid-base properties and polarities are all critical for docking. Thus, the LxCxE, RxL, and helix docking sites all interact with different parts of cyclin D, but disruption of any two of the three mechanism can disrupt the phosphorylation of Rb in vitro. The helix binding, perhaps the most important, functions as a structural requirement. It makes evolving more difficult, leading the cyclin D-Cdk4/6 complex to have relatively small number of substrates relative to other cyclin-Cdk complexes. Ultimately this contributes to the adequate phosphorylation of a key target in Rb.

All six cyclin D-Cdk4,6 complexes (cyclin D1/D2/D3 with Cdk4/6) target Rb for phosphorylation through helix-based docking. The shared α 1 helix hydrophobic patch that all cyclin D's have is not responsible for recognizing the C-terminal helix. Rather, it recognizes the RxL sequences that are linear, including those on Rb. Through experiments with purified cyclin D1-Cdk2, it was concluded that the helix docking site likely lies on cyclin D rather than the Cdk4,6. As a result, likely another region on cyclin D recognizes the Rb C-terminal helix.

Since Rb's C – terminal helix exclusively binds cyclin D-Cdk4,6 and not other cell cycle dependent cyclin-Cdk complexes, through experiments mutating this helix in HMEC cells, it has been conclusively shown that the cyclin D – Rb interaction is critical in the following roles (1) promoting the G1/S transition (2) allowing Rb dissociation from chromatin, and (3) E2F1 activation.

== Regulation ==
=== In vertebrates ===
Cyclin D is regulated by the downstream pathway of mitogen receptors via the Ras/MAP kinase and the β-catenin-Tcf/LEF pathways and PI3K. The MAP kinase ERK activates the downstream transcription factors Myc, AP-1 and Fos which in turn activate the transcription of the Cdk4, Cdk6 and cyclin D genes, and increase ribosome biogenesis. Rho family GTPases, integrin linked kinase and focal adhesion kinase (FAK) activate cyclin D gene in response to integrin.

p27^{Kip1} and p21^{cip1} are cyclin-dependent kinase inhibitors (CKIs) which negatively regulate CDKs. However they are also promoters of the cyclin D-CDK4/6 complex. Without p27 and p21, cyclin D levels are reduced and the complex is not formed at detectable levels.

In eukaryotes, overexpression of translation initiation factor 4E (eIF4E) leads to an increased level of cyclin D protein and increased amount of cyclin D mRNA outside of the nucleus. This is because eIF4E promotes the export of cyclin D mRNAs out of the nucleus.

Inhibition of cyclin D via inactivation or degradation leads to cell cycle exit and differentiation. Inactivation of cyclin D is triggered by several cyclin-dependent kinase inhibitor protein (CKIs) like the INK4 family (e.g. p14, p15, p16, p18). INK4 proteins are activated in response to hyperproliferative stress response that inhibits cell proliferation due to overexpression of e.g. Ras and Myc. Hence, INK4 binds to cyclin D- dependent CDKs and inactivates the whole complex. Glycogen synthase kinase three beta, GSK3β, causes Cyclin D degradation by inhibitory phosphorylation on threonine 286 of the Cyclin D protein. GSK3β is negatively controlled by the PI3K pathway in form of phosphorylation, which is one of several ways in which growth factors regulate cyclin D. Amount of cyclin D in the cell can also be regulated by transcriptional induction, stabilization of the protein, its translocation to the nucleus and its assembly with Cdk4 and Cdk6.

It has been shown that the inhibition of cyclin D (cyclin D1 and 2, in particular) could result from the induction of WAF1/CIP1/p21 protein by PDT. By inhibiting cyclin D, this induction also inhibits Ckd2 and 6. All these processes combined lead to an arrest of the cell in G0/G1 stage.

There are two ways in which DNA damage affects Cdks. Following DNA damage, cyclin D (cyclin D1) is rapidly and transiently degraded by the proteasome upon its ubiquitylation by the CRL4-AMBRA1 ubiquitin ligase. This degradation causes release of p21 from Cdk4 complexes, which inactivates Cdk2 in a p53-independent manner. Another way in which DNA damage targets Cdks is p53-dependent induction of p21, which inhibits cyclin E-Cdk2 complex. In healthy cells, wild-type p53 is quickly degraded by the proteasome. However, DNA damage causes it to accumulate by making it more stable.

=== In yeast ===
A simplification in yeast is that all cyclins bind to the same Cdc subunit, the Cdc28. Cyclins in yeast are controlled by expression, inhibition via CKIs like Far1, and degradation by ubiquitin-mediated proteolysis.

== Role in cancer ==
Given that many human cancers happen in response to errors in cell cycle regulation and in growth factor dependent intracellular pathways, involvement of cyclin D in cell cycle control and growth factor signaling makes it a possible oncogene. In normal cells overproduction of cyclin D shortens the duration of G1 phase only, and considering the importance of cyclin D in growth factor signaling, defects in its regulation could be responsible for absence of growth regulation in cancer cells. Uncontrolled production of cyclin D affects amounts of cyclin D-Cdk4 complex being formed, which can drive the cell through the G0/S checkpoint, even when the growth factors are not present.

Evidence that cyclin D1 is required for tumorigenesis includes the finding that inactivation of cyclin D1 by anti-sense or gene deletion reduced breast tumor and gastrointestinal tumor growth in vivo. Cyclin D1 overexpression is sufficient for the induction of mammary tumorigenesis, attributed to the induction of cell proliferation, increased cell survival, induction of chromosomal instability, restraint of autophagy and potentially non-canonical functions.

Overexpression is induced as a result of gene amplification, growth factor or oncogene induced expression by Src, Ras, ErbB2, STAT3, STAT5, impaired protein degradation, or chromosomal translocation. Gene amplification is responsible for overproduction of cyclin D protein in bladder cancer and esophageal carcinoma, among others.

In cases of sarcomas, colorectal cancers and melanomas, cyclin D overproduction is noted, however, without the amplification of the chromosomal region that encodes it (chromosome 11q13, putative oncogene PRAD1, which has been identified as a translocation event in case of mantle cell lymphoma). In parathyroid adenoma, cyclin D hyper-production is caused by chromosomal translocation, which would place expression of cyclin D (more specifically, cyclin D1) under an inappropriate promoter, leading to overexpression. In this case, cyclin D gene has been translocated to the parathyroid hormone gene, and this event caused abnormal levels of cyclin D. The same mechanisms of overexpression of cyclin D is observed in some tumors of the antibody-producing B cells. Likewise, overexpression of cyclin D protein due to gene translocation is observed in human breast cancer.

Additionally, the development of cancer is also enhanced by the fact that retinoblastoma tumor suppressor protein (Rb), one of the key substrates of cyclin D-Cdk 4/6 complex, is quite frequently mutated in human tumors. In its active form, Rb prevents crossing of the G1 checkpoint by blocking transcription of genes responsible for advances in cell cycle. Cyclin D/Cdk4 complex phosphorylates Rb, which inactivates it and allows for the cell to go through the checkpoint. In the event of abnormal inactivation of Rb, in cancer cells, an important regulator of cell cycle progression is lost. When Rb is mutated, levels of cyclin D and p16INK4 are normal.

Another regulator of passage through G1 restriction point is Cdk inhibitor p16, which is encoded by INK4 gene. P16 functions in inactivating cyclin D/Cdk 4 complex. Thus, blocking transcription of INK4 gene would increase cyclin D/Cdk4 activity, which would in turn result in abnormal inactivation of Rb. On the other hand, in case of cyclin D in cancer cells (or loss of p16INK4) wild-type Rb is retained. Due to the importance of p16INK/cyclin D/Cdk4 or 6/Rb pathway in growth factor signaling, mutations in any of the players involved can give rise to cancer.

== Mutant phenotype ==
Studies with mutants suggest that cyclins are positive regulators of cell cycle entry. In yeast, expression of any of the three G1 cyclins triggers cell cycle entry. Since cell cycle progression is related to cell size, mutations in Cyclin D and its homologues show a delay in cell cycle entry and thus, cells with variants in cyclin D have bigger than normal cell size at cell division.

p27^{−}/^{−} knockout phenotype show an overproduction of cells because cyclin D is not inhibited anymore, while p27^{−}/^{−} and cyclin D^{−}/^{−} knockouts develop normally.

== See also ==
- CDK
- Cyclins
- Cell cycle
