= CDKN1B =

Protein-coding gene in humans

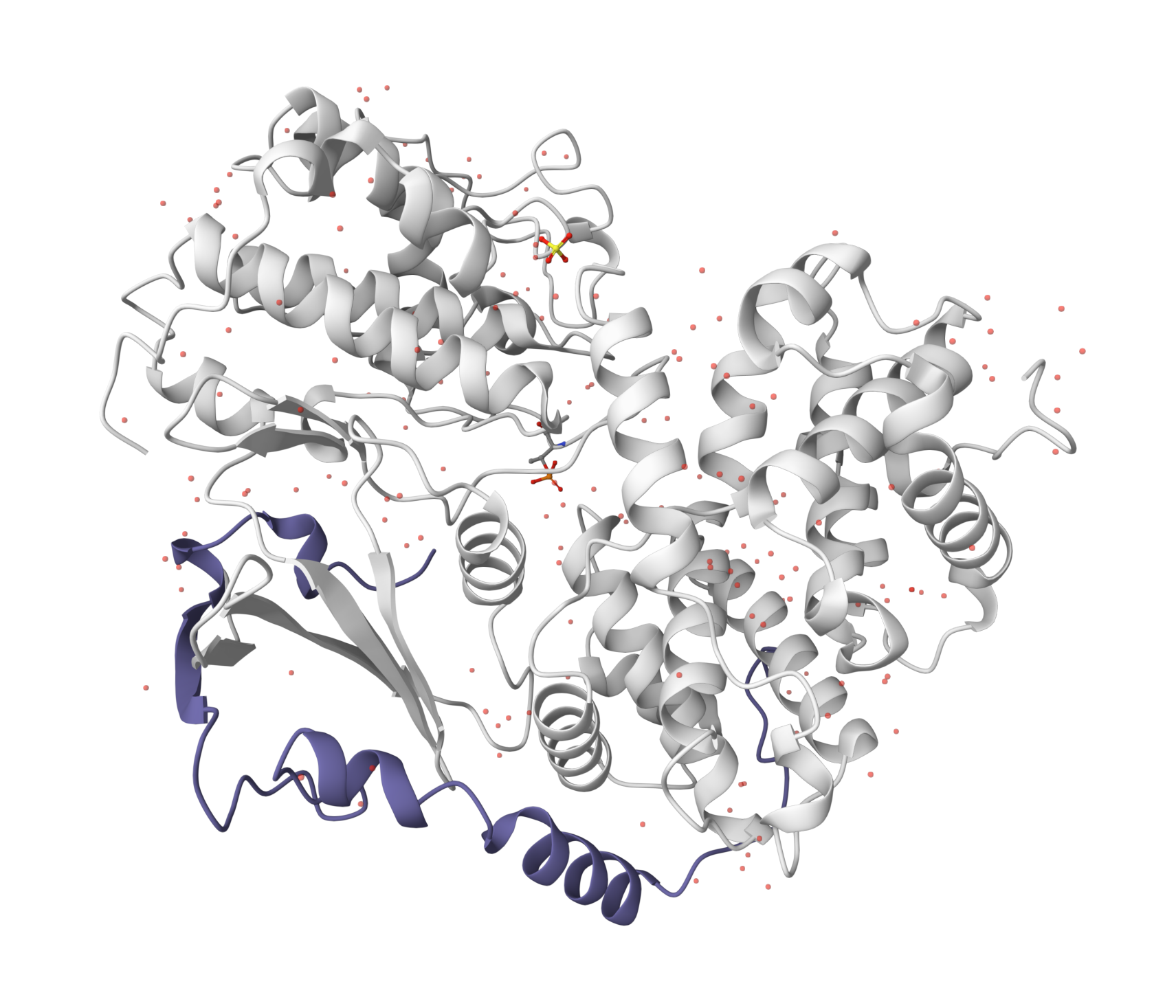

Identifiers
- Aliases: CDKN1B, CDKN4, KIP1, MEN1B, MEN4, P27KIP1, cyclin-dependent kinase inhibitor 1B, cyclin dependent kinase inhibitor 1B
- External IDs: OMIM: 600778; MGI: 104565; GeneCards: CDKN1B
Available structures
PDB	Ortholog search: PDBe RCSB
PDB	List of PDB id codes 2AST, 1H27, 1JSU

Gene location (Human)
Chr.	Chromosome 12 (human)
Band	12p13.1	Start	12,685,498 bp
Band	12p13.1	End	12,722,369 bp

Gene location (Mouse)
Chr.	Chromosome 6 (mouse)
Band	6 G1|6 65.77 cM	Start	134,897,364 bp
Band	6 G1|6 65.77 cM	End	134,902,476 bp
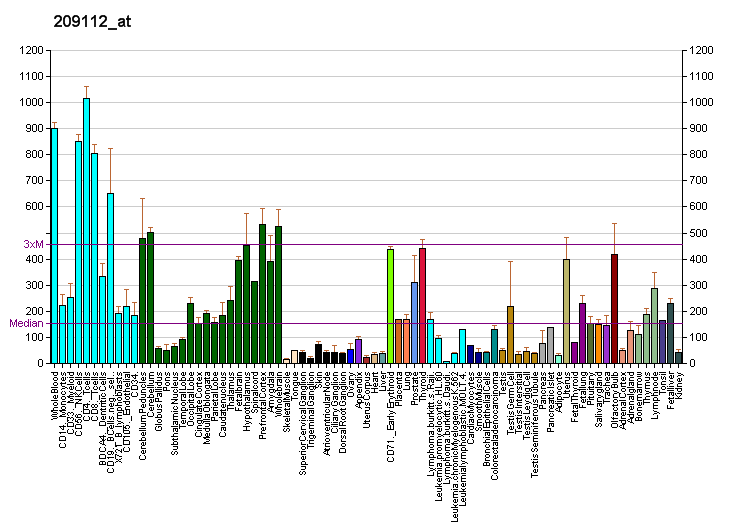
RNA expression pattern
Bgee	Human / Mouse (ortholog); Top expressed in: retinal pigment epithelium; ventricular zone; ganglionic eminence; pons; lateral nuclear group of thalamus; trabecular bone; parietal pleura; superficial temporal artery; germinal epithelium; cerebellar vermis / Top expressed in: cerebellar vermis; lobe of cerebellum; blood; pineal gland; cumulus cell; ventricular zone; granulocyte; habenula; ganglionic eminence; seminal vesicula; More reference expression data
BioGPS	More reference expression data
Gene ontology
Molecular function	protein binding; protein phosphatase binding; cyclin-dependent protein serine/threonine kinase activity; protein kinase inhibitor activity; protein kinase binding; cyclin binding; cyclin-dependent protein serine/threonine kinase inhibitor activity; Hsp70 protein binding; protein-containing complex binding; chaperone binding
Cellular component	cytoplasm; cytosol; endosome; nucleoplasm; Cul4A-RING E3 ubiquitin ligase complex; nucleus; intracellular membrane-bounded organelle; protein-containing complex
Biological process	Notch signaling pathway; regulation of cyclin-dependent protein serine/threonine kinase activity; DNA damage response, signal transduction by p53 class mediator resulting in cell cycle arrest; response to estradiol; positive regulation of cell death; response to hypoxia; response to amino acid; response to cadmium ion; positive regulation of protein catabolic process; response to organic cyclic compound; cellular response to lithium ion; cellular response to organic cyclic compound; response to peptide hormone; cell death; negative regulation of apoptotic process; hearing; response to glucose; potassium ion transport; regulation of cell population proliferation; negative regulation of cell growth; negative regulation of epithelial cell proliferation involved in prostate gland development; positive regulation of cell population proliferation; positive regulation of cyclin-dependent protein serine/threonine kinase activity; negative regulation of epithelial cell proliferation; positive regulation of microtubule polymerization; inner ear development; cellular response to antibiotic; cell cycle; negative regulation of phosphorylation; negative regulation of transcription, DNA-templated; autophagic cell death; negative regulation of cell population proliferation; negative regulation of mitotic cell cycle; negative regulation of kinase activity; positive regulation of cell cycle; negative regulation of vascular associated smooth muscle cell proliferation; placenta development; regulation of exit from mitosis; regulation of lens fiber cell differentiation; negative regulation of cyclin-dependent protein kinase activity; negative regulation of cell cycle; negative regulation of cyclin-dependent protein serine/threonine kinase activity; G1/S transition of mitotic cell cycle
Sources:Amigo / QuickGO
Orthologs
Databases	NCBI: entry; OMA: entry
Species	Human	Mouse
Entrez	1027	12576
Ensembl	ENSG00000111276	ENSMUSG00000003031
UniProt	P46527	P46414
RefSeq (mRNA)	NM_004064	NM_009875
RefSeq (protein)	NP_004055	NP_034005
Location (UCSC)	Chr 12: 12.69 – 12.72 Mb	Chr 6: 134.9 – 134.9 Mb
PubMed search
- Wikidata
View/Edit Human	View/Edit Mouse

Cyclin-dependent kinase inhibitor 1B (p27^{Kip1}) is an enzyme inhibitor that in humans is encoded by the CDKN1B gene. It encodes a protein which belongs to the Cip/Kip family of cyclin dependent kinase (Cdk) inhibitor proteins. The encoded protein binds to and prevents the activation of cyclin E-CDK2 or cyclin D-CDK4 complexes, and thus controls the cell cycle progression at G1. It is often referred to as a cell cycle inhibitor protein because its major function is to stop or slow down the cell division cycle.

== Function ==
The p27^{Kip1} gene has a DNA sequence similar to other members of the "Cip/Kip" family which include the p21^{Cip1/Waf1} and p57^{Kip2} genes. In addition to this structural similarity the "Cip/Kip" proteins share the functional characteristic of being able to bind several different classes of Cyclin and Cdk molecules. For example, p27^{Kip1} binds to cyclin D either alone, or when complexed to its catalytic subunit CDK4. In doing so p27^{Kip1} inhibits the catalytic activity of Cdk4, which means that it prevents Cdk4 from adding phosphate residues to its principal substrate, the retinoblastoma (pRb) protein. Increased levels of the p27^{Kip1} protein typically cause cells to arrest in the G1 phase of the cell cycle. Likewise, p27^{Kip1} is able to bind other Cdk proteins when complexed to cyclin subunits such as Cyclin E/Cdk2 and Cyclin A/Cdk2.

== Regulation ==
In general, extracellular growth factors which promote cell division reduce transcription and translation of p27^{Kip1}. Also, increased synthesis of CDk4,6/cyclin D causes binding of p27 to this complex, sequestering it from binding to the CDk2/cyclin E complex. Furthermore, an active CDK2/cyclin E complex will phosphorylate p27 and tag p27 for ubiquitination. A mutation of this gene may lead to loss of control over the cell cycle leading to uncontrolled cellular proliferation. Loss of p27 expression has been observed in metastatic canine mammary carcinomas. Decreased TGF-beta signalling has been suggested to cause loss of p27 expression in this tumor type.

A structured cis-regulatory element has been found in the 5' UTR of the P27 mRNA where it is thought to regulate translation relative to cell cycle progression.

P27 regulation is accomplished by two different mechanisms. In the first its concentration is changed by the individual rates of transcription, translation, and proteolysis. P27 can also be regulated by changing its subcellular location Both mechanisms act to reduce levels of p27, allowing for the activation of Cdk1 and Cdk2, and for the cell to begin progressing through the cell cycle.

=== Transcription ===
Transcription of the CDKN1B gene is activated by Forkhead box class O family (FoxO) proteins which also acts downstream to promote p27 nuclear localization and decrease levels of COP9 subunit 5(COPS5) which helps in the degradation of p27. Transcription for p27 is activated by FoxO in response to cytokines, promyelocytic leukaemia proteins, and nuclear Akt signaling. P27 transcription has also been linked to another tumor suppressor gene, MEN1, in pancreatic islet cells where it promotes CDKN1B expression.

=== Translation ===
Translation of CDKN1B reaches its maximum during quiescence and early G1. Translation is regulated by polypyrimidine tract-binding protein(PTB), ELAVL1, ELAVL4, and microRNAs. PTB acts by binding CDKN1b IRES to increase translation and when PTB levels decrease, G1 phase is shortened. ELAVL1 and ELAVL4 also bind to CDKN1B IRES but they do so in order to decrease translation and so depletion of either results in G1 arrest.

=== Proteolysis ===
Degradation of the p27 protein occurs as cells exit quiescence and enter G1. Protein levels continue to fall rapidly as the cell continues through G1 and enters S phase. One of the most understood mechanisms for p27 proteolysis is the polyubiquitylation of p27 by the SCF^{SKP2} kinase associated protein 1 (Skp1) and 2 (Skp2). SKP1 and Skp2 degrades p27 after it has been phosphorylated at threonine 187 (Thr187) by either activating cyclin E- or cyclin A-CDK2. Skp2 is mainly responsible for the degradation of p27 levels that continues through S phase. However it is rarely expressed in early G1 where p27 levels first begin to decrease. During early G1 proteolysis of p27 is regulated by KIP1 Ubiquitylation Promoting Complex (KPC) which binds to its CDK inhibitory domain. P27 also has three Cdk-inhibited tyrosines at residues 74, 88, and 89. Of these, Tyr74 is of special interest because it is specific to p27-type inhibitors.

=== Nuclear export ===
Alternatively to the transcription, translation, and proteolytic method of regulation, p27 levels can also be changed by exporting p27 to the cytoplasm. This occurs when p27 is phosphorylated on Ser(10) which allows for CRM1, a nuclear export carrier protein, to bind to and remove p27 from the nucleus. Once p27 is excluded from the nucleus it cannot inhibit the cell's growth. In the cytoplasm it may be degraded entirely or retained. This step occurs very early when the cell is exiting the quiescent phase and thus is independent of Skp2 degradation of p27.

=== MicroRNA regulation ===
Because p27 levels can be moderated at the translational level, it has been proposed that p27 may be regulated by miRNAs. Recent research has suggested that both miR-221 and miR-222 control p27 levels although the pathways are not well understood.

== Role in cancer ==
=== Proliferation ===
p27 is considered a tumor suppressor because of its function as a regulator of the cell cycle. In cancers it is often inactivated via impaired synthesis, accelerated degradation, or mislocalization. Inactivation of p27 is generally accomplished post-transcription by the oncogenic activation of various pathways including receptor tyrosine kinases (RTK), phosphatilidylinositol 3-kinase (PI3K), SRC, or Ras-mitogen activated protein kinase(MAPK). These act to accelerate the proteolysis of the p27 protein and allow the cancer cell to undergo rapid division and uncontrolled proliferation. When p27 is phosphorylated by Src at tyrosine 74 or 88 it ceases to inhibit cyclinE-cdk2. Src was also shown to reduce the half life of p27 meaning it is degraded faster. Many epithelial cancers are known to overexpress EGFR which plays a role in the proteolysis of p27 and in Ras-driven proteolysis. Non-epithelial cancers use different pathways to inactivate p27. Many cancer cells also upregulate Skp2 which is known to play an active role in the proteolysis of p27 As a result, Skp2 is inversely related to p27 levels and directly correlates with tumor grade in many malignancies.

=== Metastasis ===
In cancer cells, p27 can also be mislocalized to the cytoplasm in order to facilitate metastasis. The mechanisms by which it acts on motility differ between cancers. In hepatocellular carcinoma cells p27 co-localizes with actin fibers to act on GTPase Rac and induce cell migration. In breast cancer cytoplasmic p27 reduced RHOA activity which increased a cell's propensity for motility.

This role for p27 may indicate why cancer cells rarely fully inactivate or delete p27. By retaining p27 in some capacity it can be exported to the cytoplasm during tumorigenesis and manipulated to aid in metastasis. 70% of metastatic melanomas were shown to exhibit cytoplasmic p27, while in benign melanomas p27 remained localized to the nucleus. P27 is misplaced to the cytoplasm by the MAP2K, Ras, and Akt pathways although the mechanisms are not entirely understood. Additionally, phosphorylation of p27 at T198 by RSK1 has been shown to mislocalize p27 to the cytoplasm as well as inhibit the RhoA pathway. Because inhibition of RhoA results in a decrease in both stress fibers and focal adhesion, cell motility is increased. P27 can also be exported to the cytoplasm by oncogenic activation of the P13K pathway. Thus, mislocalization of p27 to the cytoplasm in cancer cells allows them to proliferate unchecked and provides for increased motility.

In contrast to these results, p27 has also been shown to be an inhibitor of migration in sarcoma cells. In these cells, p27 bound to stathmin which prevents stathmin from binding to tubulin and thus polymerization of microtubules increased and cell motility decreased.

=== MicroRNA regulation ===
Studies of various cell lines including glioblastoma cell lines, three prostate cancer cell lines, and a breast tumor cell line showed that suppressing miR-221 and miR-22 expression resulted in p27-dependent G1 growth arrest Then when p27 was knocked down, cell growth resumed indicating a strong role for miRNA regulated p27. Studies in patients have demonstrated an inverse correlation between miR-221&22 and p27 protein levels. Additionally nearby healthy tissue showed high expression of the p27 protein while miR-221&22 concentrations were low.

== Regulation in specific cancers ==
In most cancers reduced levels of nuclear p27 are correlated with increased tumor size, increased tumor grade, and a higher propensity for metastasis. However the mechanisms by which levels of p27 are regulated vary between cancers.

=== Breast ===
In breast cancer, Src activation has been shown to correlate with low levels of p27 Breast cancers that were Estrogen receptor negative and progesterone receptor negative were more likely to display low levels of p27 and more likely to have a high tumor grade. Similarly, breast cancer patients with BRCA1/2 mutations were more likely to have low levels of p27.

=== Prostate ===
A mutation in the CDKN1B gene has been linked to an increased risk for hereditary prostate cancer in humans.

=== Multiple Endocrine Neoplasia ===
Mutations in the CDKN1B gene has been reported in families affected by the development of primary hyperparathyroidism and pituitary adenomas, and has been classified MEN4 (multiple endocrine neoplasia, type 4). Testing for CDKN1B mutations has been recommended in patients with suspected MEN, in whom previous testing for, the more common MEN1/RET mutation, is negative.

== Clinical significance ==
=== Prognostic value ===
Several studies have demonstrated that reduced p27 levels indicate a poorer patient prognosis. However, because of the dual, contrasting roles p27 plays in cancer (as an inhibitor of growth and as a mechanism for metastasis) low levels of p27 may demonstrate that a cancer is not aggressive and will remain benign. In ovarian cancer, p27 negative tumors progressed in 23 months compared to 85 months in p27 positive tumors and thus could be used as a prognostic marker. Similar studies have correlated low levels of p27 with a worse prognosis in breast cancer. Colorectal carcinomas that lacked p27 were shown to have increased p27-specific proteolysis and a median survival of only 69 months compared to 151 months for patients with high or normal levels of p27. The authors proposed clinicians could use patient specific levels of p27 to determine who would benefit from adjuvant therapy. Similar correlations were observed in patients with non-small cell lung cancer, those with colon, and prostate cancer.

So far studies have only evaluated the prognostic value of p27 retrospectively and a standardized scoring system has not been established. However it has been proposed that clinicians should evaluate a patient's p27 levels in order to determine if they will be responsive to certain chemotoxins which target fast growing tumors where p27 levels are low. Or in contrast, if p27 levels are found to be high in a patient's cancer, their risk for metastasis is higher and the physician can make an informed decision about their treatment plan. Because p27 levels are controlled post-transcriptionally, proteomic surveys can be used to establish and monitor a patient's individual levels which aids in the future of individualized medicine.

The following cancers have been demonstrated to have an inverse correlation with p27 expression and prognosis: oro-pharyngo-laryngeal, oesophageal, gastric, colon, lung, melanoma, glioma, breast cancer, prostate, lymphoma, leukemia.

=== Correlation to treatment response ===
P27 may also allow clinicians to better select an appropriate treatment for a patient. For example, patients with non-small cell lung cancer who were treated with platinum based chemotherapy showed reduced survival if they had low levels of p27. Similarly low levels of p27 correlated with poor results from adjuvant chemotherapy in breast cancer patients.

=== Value as a therapeutic target ===
P27 has been explored as a potential target for cancer therapy because its levels are highly correlated to patient prognosis. This is true for a wide spectrum of cancers including colon, breast, prostate, lung, liver, stomach, and bladder.

==== Use of microRNAs for therapy ====
Because of the role miRNAs play in p27 regulation, research is underway to determine if antagomiRs that block the activity of the miR221&222 and allow for p27 cell grow inhibition to take place could act as therapeutic cancer drugs.

== Role in Regeneration ==
Knockdown of CDKN1B stimulates regeneration of cochlear hair cells in mice. Since CDKN1B prevents cells from entering the cell cycle, inhibition of the protein could cause re-entry and subsequent division. In mammals where regeneration of cochlear hair cells normally does not occur, this inhibition could help regrow damaged cells who are otherwise incapable of proliferation. In fact, when the CDKN1B gene is disrupted in adult mice, hair cells of the organ of Corti proliferate, while those in control mice do not. Lack of CDKN1B expression appears to release the hair cells from natural cell-cycle arrest. Because hair cell death in the human cochlea is a major cause of hearing loss, the CDKN1B protein could be an important factor in the clinical treatment of deafness.

== Interactions ==
CDKN1B has been shown to interact with:

- AKT1,
- CKS1B,
- Cyclin D3,
- Cyclin E1,
- Cyclin-dependent kinase 2,
- Cyclin-dependent kinase 4,
- Grb2,
- NUP50
- SKP2,
- SPDYA, and
- XPO1.

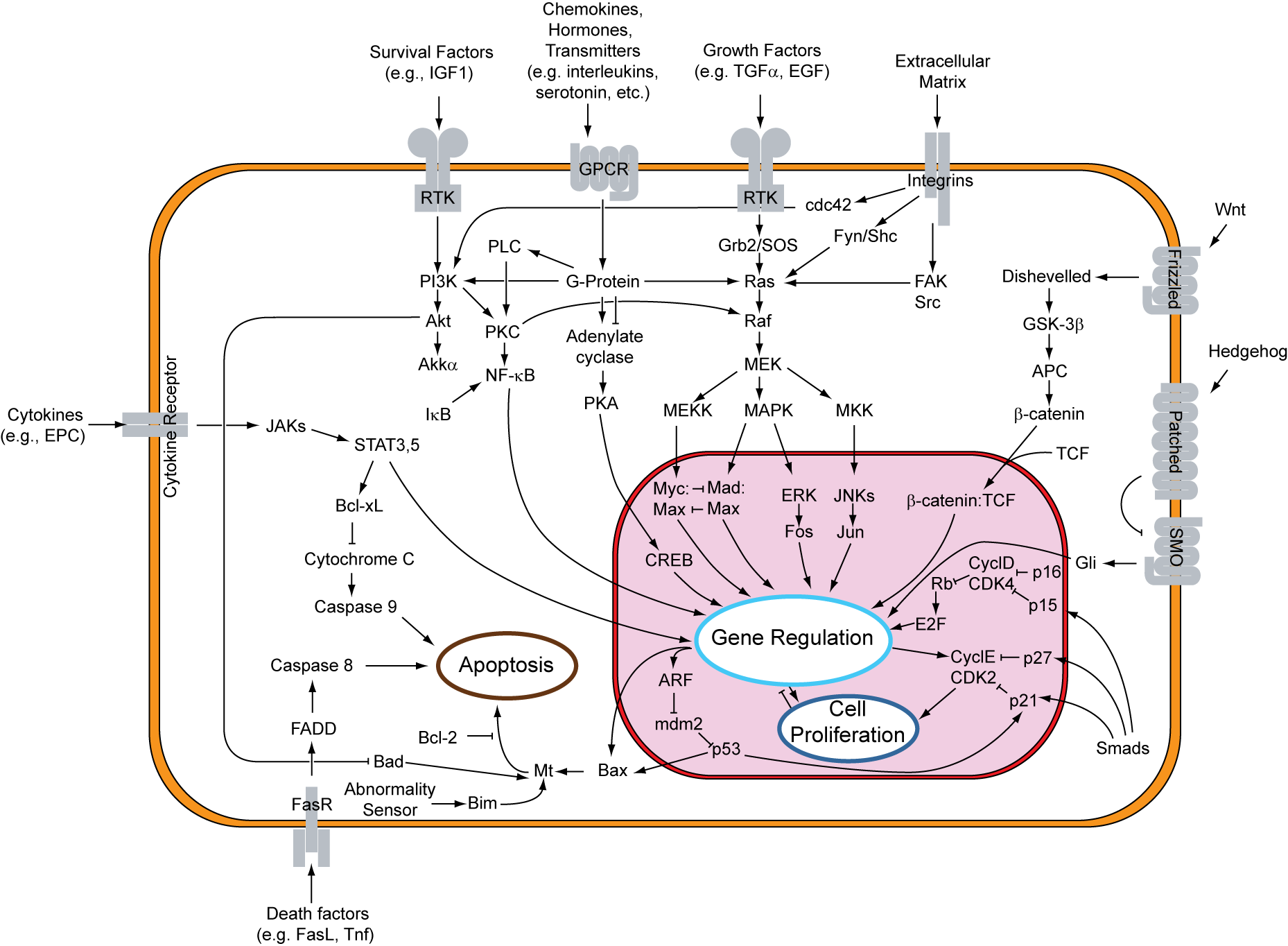
Overview of signal transduction pathways involved in apoptosis.

== See also ==
- Sic1 (homologue in Saccharomyces cerevisiae)
- P21waf-1 (another CDK inhibitor)
- Hyaluronic acid synthase
- Hyaluronidase
