= Cyclin-dependent kinase 11A =

Protein-coding gene in humans

CDK11A

Identifiers
- Aliases: CDK11A, CDC2L2, CDC2L3, CDK11-p110, CDK11-p46, CDK11-p58, PITSLRE, p58GTA, cyclin-dependent kinase 11A, cyclin dependent kinase 11A
- External IDs: OMIM: 116951; MGI: 88353; GeneCards: CDK11A
Enzyme activity
| EC # | BRENDA | ExPASy | KEGG | MetaCyc |
|---|---|---|---|---|
| 2.7.11.22 | ↗ | ↗ | ↗ | ↗ |
| 2.7.11.23 | ↗ | ↗ | ↗ | ↗ |

Gene location (Human)
| Chr. | Chromosome 1 (human) |
| Band | 1p36.33 | Start | 1,702,379 bp |
| Band | 1p36.33 | End | 1,724,357 bp |

Gene location (Mouse)
| Chr. | Chromosome 4 (mouse) |
| Band | 4 E2|4 86.73 cM | Start | 155,624,854 bp |
| Band | 4 E2|4 86.73 cM | End | 155,649,938 bp |
RNA expression pattern
| Bgee | Human / Mouse (ortholog); Top expressed in: sural nerve; mucosa of transverse colon; granulocyte; spleen; right hemisphere of cerebellum; pituitary gland; fundus; right lung; right lobe of thyroid gland; right testis / Top expressed in: granulocyte; tail of embryo; neural layer of retina; saccule; genital tubercle; otic placode; ventricular zone; otic vesicle; epiblast; body of femur; More reference expression data |
| BioGPS | n/a |
Gene ontology
| Molecular function | kinase activity; protein serine/threonine kinase activity; protein kinase activity; ATP binding; nucleotide binding; transferase activity; protein binding; cyclin-dependent protein serine/threonine kinase activity |
| Cellular component | nucleus; cytoplasm |
| Biological process | regulation of transcription, DNA-templated; phosphorylation; cell cycle; regulation of cell growth; protein phosphorylation; regulation of mRNA processing; apoptotic process; regulation of mitotic cell cycle; mitotic cell cycle; regulation of cell cycle |
Sources:Amigo / QuickGO
Orthologs
| Databases | NCBI: entry; OMA: entry |
| Species | Human | Mouse |
| Entrez | 728642 | 12537 |
| Ensembl | ENSG00000008128 | ENSMUSG00000029062 |
| UniProt | Q9UQ88 | P24788 |
| RefSeq (mRNA) | NM_001313896; NM_001313982; NM_024011; NM_033527; NM_033529 NM_033532; NM_033534 | NM_007661; NM_001347308; NM_001355567; NM_001355568; NM_001355569 |
| RefSeq (protein) | NP_001300825; NP_001300911; NP_076916; NP_277071 | NP_001334237; NP_031687; NP_001342496; NP_001342497; NP_001342498 |
| Location (UCSC) | Chr 1: 1.7 – 1.72 Mb | Chr 4: 155.62 – 155.65 Mb |
| PubMed search |
- Wikidata
| View/Edit Human | View/Edit Mouse |

Cyclin-dependent kinase 11A is an enzyme that in humans is encoded by the CDK11A gene (previously CDC2L2).

This gene shares very high sequence identity with a neighboring gene, CDK11B. These two genes are frequently deleted or altered in neuroblastoma. The protein kinase encoded by this gene can be cleaved by caspases and may play a role in cell apoptosis.
