= CDKN2B =

Protein-coding gene in humans

Identifiers
- Aliases: CDKN2B, CDK4I, INK4B, MTS2, P15, TP15, p15INK4b, cyclin-dependent kinase inhibitor 2B, cyclin dependent kinase inhibitor 2B
- External IDs: OMIM: 600431; MGI: 104737; GeneCards: CDKN2B
Available structures
PDB	Ortholog search: PDBe RCSB
PDB	List of PDB id codes 1D9S

Gene location (Human)
Chr.	Chromosome 9 (human)
Band	9p21.3	Start	22,002,903 bp
Band	9p21.3	End	22,009,305 bp

Gene location (Mouse)
Chr.	Chromosome 4 (mouse)
Band	4 C4|4 42.15 cM	Start	89,224,536 bp
Band	4 C4|4 42.15 cM	End	89,229,276 bp
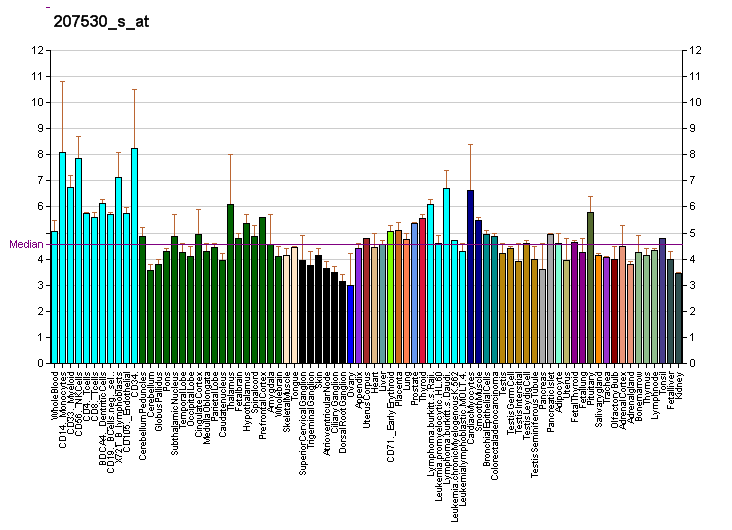
RNA expression pattern
Bgee	Human / Mouse (ortholog); Top expressed in: jejunal mucosa; mucosa of colon; mucosa of sigmoid colon; oral cavity; mucosa of transverse colon; rectum; buccal mucosa cell; duodenum; skin of hip; gums / Top expressed in: epithelium of stomach; jejunum; left colon; calvaria; ileum; endothelial cell of lymphatic vessel; mucous cell of stomach; transitional epithelium of urinary bladder; right lung lobe; conjunctival fornix; More reference expression data
BioGPS	More reference expression data
Gene ontology
Molecular function	protein binding; cyclin-dependent protein serine/threonine kinase inhibitor activity; protein kinase binding
Cellular component	cytoplasm; cytosol; nucleus
Biological process	cellular response to extracellular stimulus; megakaryocyte differentiation; positive regulation of transforming growth factor beta receptor signaling pathway; regulation of cyclin-dependent protein serine/threonine kinase activity; mitotic cell cycle checkpoint signaling; spleen development; cellular response to nutrient; negative regulation of G1/S transition of mitotic cell cycle; G2/M transition of mitotic cell cycle; negative regulation of epithelial cell proliferation; cell cycle; negative regulation of phosphorylation; positive regulation of transcription by RNA polymerase II; negative regulation of cell population proliferation; negative regulation of cyclin-dependent protein serine/threonine kinase activity; cellular senescence
Sources:Amigo / QuickGO
Orthologs
Databases	NCBI: entry; OMA: entry
Species	Human	Mouse
Entrez	1030	12579
Ensembl	ENSG00000147883	ENSMUSG00000073802
UniProt	P42772	P55271
RefSeq (mRNA)	NM_078487; NM_004936	NM_007670
RefSeq (protein)	NP_004927; NP_511042	NP_031696
Location (UCSC)	Chr 9: 22 – 22.01 Mb	Chr 4: 89.22 – 89.23 Mb
PubMed search
- Wikidata
View/Edit Human	View/Edit Mouse

Cyclin-dependent kinase 4 inhibitor B also known as multiple tumor suppressor 2 (MTS-2) or p15^{INK4b} is a protein that is encoded by the CDKN2B gene in humans.

== Function ==
This gene lies adjacent to the tumor suppressor gene CDKN2A in a region that is frequently mutated, deleted, or disregulated in a wide variety of cancer. This gene encodes a cyclin-dependent kinase inhibitor, also known as p15Ink4b protein, which forms a complex with CDK4 or CDK6, and prevents the activation of the CDK kinases by cyclin D, thus the encoded protein functions as a cell growth regulator that inhibits cell cycle G1 progression. The expression of this gene was found to be dramatically induced by TGF beta, which suggested its role in the TGF beta induced growth inhibition. Two alternatively spliced transcripts of this gene encode proteins that share the N-terminal sequence but completely differ in the C-terminus.

== Interactions ==
CDKN2B tumor suppressor gene product p15 has been shown to interact with cyclin-dependent kinase 4.
