= Cyclin-dependent kinase 11B =

Protein-coding gene in humans

CDK11B

Identifiers
- Aliases: CDK11B, CDC2L1, CDK11, CDK11-p110, CDK11-p46, CDK11-p58, CLK-1, PITSLREA, PK58, p58, p58CDC2L1, p58CLK-1, cyclin-dependent kinase 11B, cyclin dependent kinase 11B
- External IDs: OMIM: 176873; MGI: 88353; GeneCards: CDK11B
Enzyme activity
EC #	BRENDA	ExPASy	KEGG	MetaCyc
2.7.11.22	↗	↗	↗	↗
2.7.11.23	↗	↗	↗	↗

Gene location (Human)
Chr.	Chromosome 1 (human)
Band	1p36.33	Start	1,635,225 bp
Band	1p36.33	End	1,659,012 bp

Gene location (Mouse)
Chr.	Chromosome 4 (mouse)
Band	4 E2|4 86.73 cM	Start	155,624,854 bp
Band	4 E2|4 86.73 cM	End	155,649,938 bp
RNA expression pattern
Bgee	Human / Mouse (ortholog); Top expressed in: sural nerve; gastrocnemius muscle; gastric mucosa; left testis; muscle layer of sigmoid colon; right testis; granulocyte; mucosa of transverse colon; muscle of thigh; right lung / Top expressed in: granulocyte; tail of embryo; neural layer of retina; saccule; genital tubercle; otic placode; ventricular zone; otic vesicle; epiblast; body of femur; More reference expression data
BioGPS	n/a
Gene ontology
Molecular function	protein binding; kinase activity; nucleotide binding; transferase activity; protein serine/threonine kinase activity; ATP binding; protein kinase activity; cyclin-dependent protein serine/threonine kinase activity; RNA binding
Cellular component	nucleus; cytoplasm
Biological process	regulation of transcription, DNA-templated; phosphorylation; cell cycle; regulation of cell growth; cell population proliferation; regulation of mRNA processing; apoptotic process; protein phosphorylation; regulation of mitotic cell cycle; mitotic cell cycle; regulation of cell cycle
Sources:Amigo / QuickGO
Orthologs
Databases	NCBI: entry; OMA: entry
Species	Human	Mouse
Entrez	984	12537
Ensembl	ENSG00000248333	ENSMUSG00000029062
UniProt	P21127	P24788
RefSeq (mRNA)	NM_001291345; NM_001787; NM_033486; NM_033487; NM_033488 NM_033489; NM_033490; NM_033492; NM_033493	NM_007661; NM_001347308; NM_001355567; NM_001355568; NM_001355569
RefSeq (protein)	NP_001278274; NP_001778; NP_277021; NP_277022; NP_277024 NP_277025	NP_001334237; NP_031687; NP_001342496; NP_001342497; NP_001342498
Location (UCSC)	Chr 1: 1.64 – 1.66 Mb	Chr 4: 155.62 – 155.65 Mb
PubMed search
- Wikidata
View/Edit Human	View/Edit Mouse

Cyclin-dependent kinase 11B is an enzyme that in humans is encoded by the CDK11B gene (previously CDC2L1).

This gene encodes a member of the p34Cdc2 protein kinase family. p34Cdc2 kinase family members are known to be essential for eukaryotic cell cycle control. This gene is in close proximity to CDK11A, a nearly identical gene in the same chromosomal region. The gene loci including this gene, CDK11A, as well as metalloprotease MMP21/22, consist of two identical, tandemly linked genomic regions which are thought to be a part of the larger region that has been duplicated. This gene and CDK11A were shown to be deleted or altered frequently in neuroblastoma with amplified MYCN genes. The protein kinase encoded by this gene could be cleaved by caspases and was demonstrated to play roles in cell apoptosis. Several alternatively spliced variants of this gene have been reported.

== Interactions ==
CDK11B has been shown to interact with Cyclin D3.
