= Cyclin D3 =

Protein-coding gene in the species Homo sapiens

CCND3

Identifiers
- Aliases: CCND3, cyclin D3
- External IDs: OMIM: 123834; MGI: 88315; GeneCards: CCND3
Available structures
PDB	Ortholog search: PDBe RCSB
PDB	List of PDB id codes 3G33

Gene location (Human)
Chr.	Chromosome 6 (human)
Band	6p21.1	Start	41,934,934 bp
Band	6p21.1	End	42,050,357 bp

Gene location (Mouse)
Chr.	Chromosome 17 (mouse)
Band	17 C|17 23.37 cM	Start	47,815,976 bp
Band	17 C|17 23.37 cM	End	47,910,616 bp
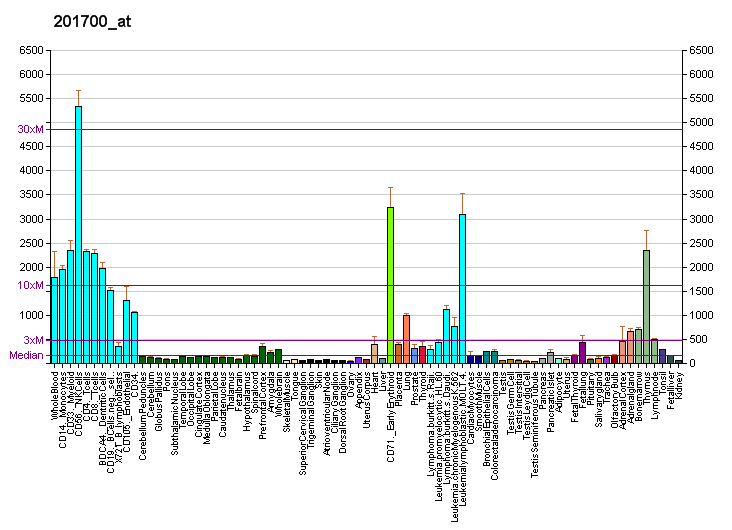
RNA expression pattern
Bgee	Human / Mouse (ortholog); Top expressed in: granulocyte; thymus; blood; spleen; lymph node; mononuclear cell; monocyte; right adrenal cortex; right lung; bone marrow / Top expressed in: granulocyte; thymus; fetal liver hematopoietic progenitor cell; tibiofemoral joint; yolk sac; efferent ductule; human fetus; dermis; adrenal gland; atrium; More reference expression data
BioGPS	More reference expression data
Gene ontology
Molecular function	cyclin-dependent protein serine/threonine kinase activity; protein binding; protein kinase binding; protein kinase activity; cyclin-dependent protein serine/threonine kinase regulator activity
Cellular component	nucleoplasm; cyclin-dependent protein kinase holoenzyme complex; membrane; nucleus; cytoplasm
Biological process	T cell proliferation; cell cycle; positive regulation of protein phosphorylation; signal transduction; positive regulation of cyclin-dependent protein serine/threonine kinase activity; regulation of cell cycle; cell division; negative regulation of transcription by RNA polymerase II; regulation of cell population proliferation; regulation of insulin receptor signaling pathway; regulation of cyclin-dependent protein serine/threonine kinase activity; mitotic cell cycle; protein phosphorylation; regulation of mitotic nuclear division; positive regulation of cell population proliferation; positive regulation of cell cycle; positive regulation of G1/S transition of mitotic cell cycle
Sources:Amigo / QuickGO
Orthologs
Databases	NCBI: entry; OMA: entry
Species	Human	Mouse
Entrez	896	12445
Ensembl	ENSG00000112576	ENSMUSG00000034165
UniProt	P30281	P30282
RefSeq (mRNA)	NM_001136017; NM_001136125; NM_001136126; NM_001287427; NM_001287434 NM_001760	NM_001081635; NM_001081636; NM_007632
RefSeq (protein)	NP_001129489; NP_001129597; NP_001129598; NP_001274356; NP_001274363 NP_001751	NP_001075104; NP_001075105; NP_031658
Location (UCSC)	Chr 6: 41.93 – 42.05 Mb	Chr 17: 47.82 – 47.91 Mb
PubMed search
- Wikidata
View/Edit Human	View/Edit Mouse

G1/S-specific cyclin-D3 is a protein that in humans is encoded by the CCND3 gene.

== Function ==
The protein encoded by this gene belongs to the highly conserved cyclin family, whose members are characterized by a dramatic periodicity in protein abundance through the cell cycle. Cyclins function as regulators of CDK kinases. Different cyclins exhibit distinct expression and degradation patterns which contribute to the temporal coordination of each mitotic event. This cyclin forms a complex with and functions as a regulatory subunit of CDK4 or CDK6, whose activity is required for cell cycle G_{1}/S transition. This protein has been shown to interact with and be involved in the phosphorylation of tumor suppressor protein Rb. The CDK4 activity associated with this cyclin was reported to be necessary for cell cycle progression through G_{2} phase into mitosis after UV radiation.

== Clinical significance ==
Mutations in CCND3 are implicated in cases of breast cancer.

== Interactions ==
Cyclin D3 has been shown to interact with:

- AKAP8,
- CDC2L1,
- CDKN1B,
- CRABP2,
- Cyclin-dependent kinase 4,
- Cyclin-dependent kinase 6,
- EIF3K, and
- Retinoic acid receptor alpha.

== See also ==
- Cyclin
- Cyclin D
