= Cyclin-dependent kinase inhibitor 1C =

Protein-coding gene in the species Homo sapiens

CDKN1C

Identifiers
- Aliases: CDKN1C, BWCR, BWS, KIP2, WBS, p57, p57Kip2, cyclin-dependent kinase inhibitor 1C, cyclin dependent kinase inhibitor 1C
- External IDs: OMIM: 600856; MGI: 104564; GeneCards: CDKN1C

Gene location (Human)
Chr.	Chromosome 11 (human)
Band	11p15.4	Start	2,883,213 bp
Band	11p15.4	End	2,885,775 bp

Gene location (Mouse)
Chr.	Chromosome 7 (mouse)
Band	7 F5|7 88.22 cM	Start	143,012,076 bp
Band	7 F5|7 88.22 cM	End	143,014,787 bp
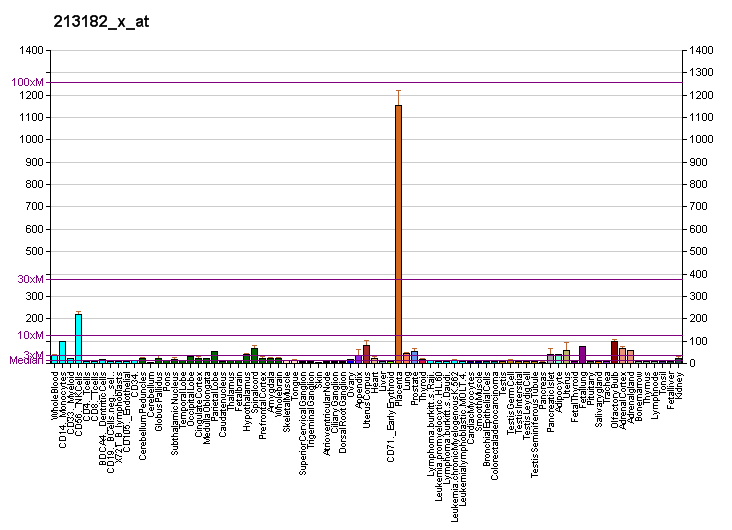

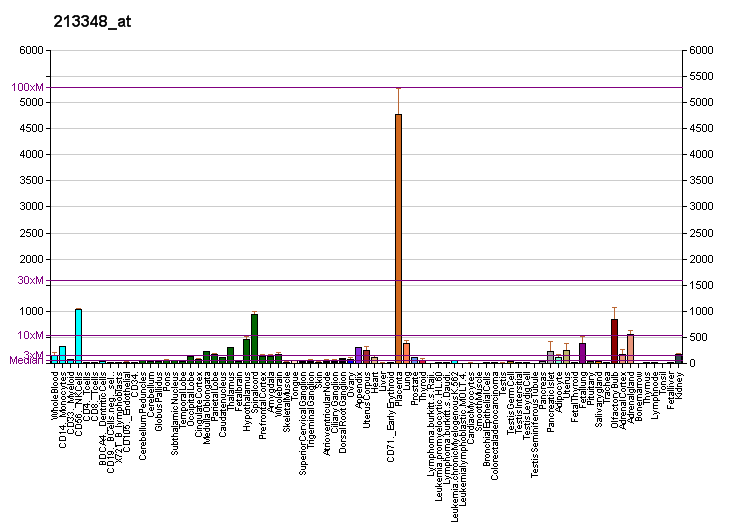

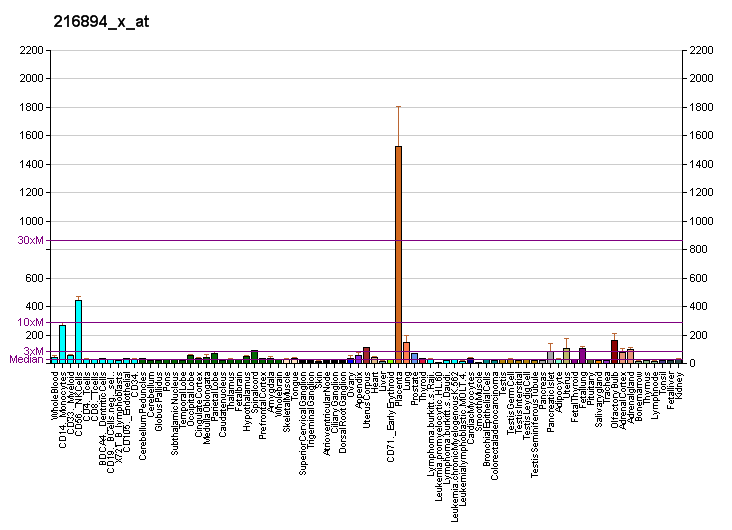
RNA expression pattern
Bgee	Human / Mouse (ortholog); Top expressed in: placenta; C1 segment; right ovary; left ovary; right adrenal cortex; tibial nerve; left adrenal cortex; left uterine tube; subcutaneous adipose tissue; human kidney / Top expressed in: human fetus; dermis; umbilical cord; genital tubercle; migratory enteric neural crest cell; efferent ductule; internal carotid artery; choroid plexus of fourth ventricle; vas deferens; renal corpuscle; More reference expression data
BioGPS	More reference expression data
Gene ontology
Molecular function	protein binding; cyclin-dependent protein serine/threonine kinase inhibitor activity; protein kinase inhibitor activity; protein-containing complex binding
Cellular component	cytoplasm; nucleus
Biological process	positive regulation of transforming growth factor beta receptor signaling pathway; positive regulation of transcription, DNA-templated; regulation of mitotic cell cycle; negative regulation of epithelial cell proliferation; negative regulation of protein serine/threonine kinase activity; cell cycle; negative regulation of transcription, DNA-templated; negative regulation of kinase activity; negative regulation of cyclin-dependent protein kinase activity; negative regulation of phosphorylation; negative regulation of transcription by RNA polymerase II; skeletal system development; kidney development; placenta development; regulation of exit from mitosis; ageing; myeloid cell differentiation; adrenal gland development; multicellular organism growth; neuron maturation; camera-type eye development; negative regulation of cyclin-dependent protein serine/threonine kinase activity; digestive system development; uterus development; embryonic placenta morphogenesis; genomic imprinting; regulation of lens fiber cell differentiation
Sources:Amigo / QuickGO
Orthologs
Databases	NCBI: entry; OMA: entry
Species	Human	Mouse
Entrez	1028	12577
Ensembl	ENSG00000273707; ENSG00000129757	ENSMUSG00000037664
UniProt	P49918	P49919
RefSeq (mRNA)	NM_000076; NM_001122630; NM_001122631; NM_001362474; NM_001362475	NM_001161624; NM_009876; NM_001354981
RefSeq (protein)	NP_000067; NP_001116102; NP_001116103; NP_001349403; NP_001349404	NP_001155096; NP_034006; NP_001341910
Location (UCSC)	Chr 11: 2.88 – 2.89 Mb	Chr 7: 143.01 – 143.01 Mb
PubMed search
- Wikidata
View/Edit Human	View/Edit Mouse

Cyclin-dependent kinase inhibitor 1C (p57, Kip2), also known as CDKN1C, is a protein which in humans is encoded by the CDKN1C imprinted gene.

== Function ==
Cyclin-dependent kinase inhibitor 1C is a tight-binding inhibitor of several G1 cyclin/Cdk complexes and a negative regulator of cell proliferation. Mutations of CDKN1C are implicated in sporadic cancers and Beckwith-Wiedemann syndrome suggesting that it is a tumor suppressor candidate.

CDKN1C is a tumor suppressor human gene on chromosome 11 (11p15) and belongs to the cip/kip gene family. It encodes a cell cycle inhibitor that binds to G1 cyclin-CDK complexes. Thus p57KIP2 causes arrest of the cell cycle in its G1 phase.

CDKN1C was found to lead to cancer cell dormancy; its gene expression is regulated through the activity of glucocorticoid receptors (GRs) through chromatin remodelling mediated by SWI/SNF.

== Research methods ==
Since it has been identified that mutation to this tumor-suppressing gene can have dramatic effects in a newborn such as macroglossia there has been great research to determine the genetic significance. CDKN1C is prone to error during the process of gene imprinting. The process of gene imprinting is in concert with DNA methylation. This makes the gene become transcriptionally silent from the paternal side allowing the maternal gene to be active. If this gene fails to be properly methylated, or obtains a mutation, there will be a lack of cell cycle suppression leading to the pediatric tumor growth.

Research methods for this gene have involved different sequencing methods such as Sanger sequencing. This sequencing method is a three-step process that involves PCR, gel electrophoresis, and computer analysis to determine DNA sequences. Sequencing can be helpful in identifying base pair mutations. A study done to assess the phenotypic effects that mutations to this gene will have taken genetic sequencing of a cohort of individuals known to be effected by a mutation on this gene. In this study, they found 37 mutations associated with 38 different pedigrees. This suggests that mutations to CDKN1C on chromosome 11 have phenotypic effects on individuals. These effects are further discussed through the different clinical cases that can occur.

== Clinical significance ==
A mutation of this gene may lead to loss of control over the cell cycle leading to uncontrolled cellular proliferation. p57KIP2 has been associated with Beckwith-Wiedemann syndrome (BWS) which is characterized by increased risk of tumor formation in childhood. Loss-of-function mutations in this gene have also been shown associated to the IMAGe syndrome (Intrauterine growth restriction, Metaphyseal dysplasia, Adrenal hypoplasia congenita, and Genital anomalies). Complete hydatidiform moles consist only of paternal DNA, and thus the cells lack p57 expression as the gene is paternally imprinted (silenced). Immunohistochemical stains for p57 can aid with the diagnosis of hydatidiform moles.

== Interactions ==
Cyclin-dependent kinase inhibitor 1C has been shown to interact with:

- LIMK1,
- MYBL2,
- MyoD, and
- PCNA.
