= CDKN2C =

Protein-coding gene in humans

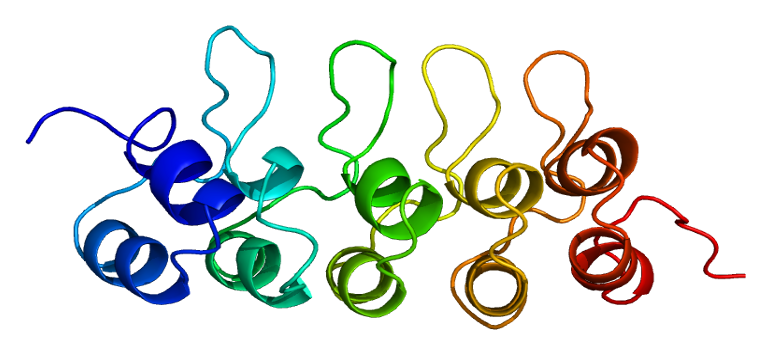

Identifiers
- Aliases: CDKN2C, INK4C, p18, p18-INK4C, cyclin-dependent kinase inhibitor 2C, cyclin dependent kinase inhibitor 2C
- External IDs: OMIM: 603369; MGI: 105388; GeneCards: CDKN2C
Available structures
PDB	Ortholog search: PDBe RCSB
PDB	List of PDB id codes 1BU9, 1G3N, 1IHB, 1MX2, 1MX4, 1MX6

Gene location (Human)
Chr.	Chromosome 1 (human)
Band	1p32.3	Start	50,960,745 bp
Band	1p32.3	End	50,974,634 bp

Gene location (Mouse)
Chr.	Chromosome 4 (mouse)
Band	4 C7|4 51.32 cM	Start	109,518,073 bp
Band	4 C7|4 51.32 cM	End	109,524,386 bp
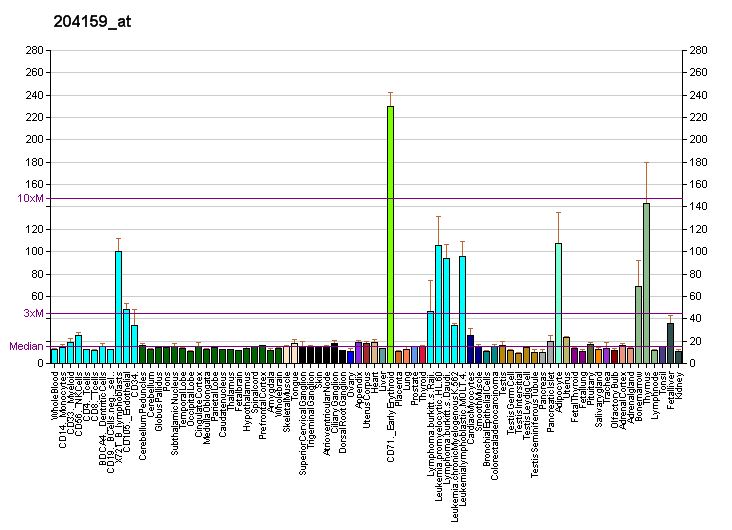

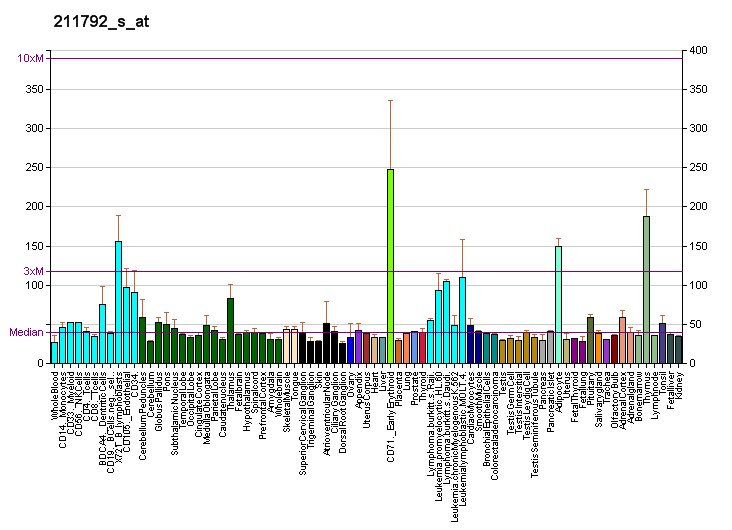
RNA expression pattern
Bgee	Human / Mouse (ortholog); Top expressed in: ventricular zone; popliteal artery; tibial arteries; adipose tissue; trabecular bone; abdominal fat; superficial temporal artery; right coronary artery; subcutaneous adipose tissue; left coronary artery / Top expressed in: spermatocyte; white adipose tissue; lactiferous gland; tibiofemoral joint; brown adipose tissue; subcutaneous adipose tissue; thymus; spermatid; epithelium of lens; fetal liver hematopoietic progenitor cell; More reference expression data
BioGPS	More reference expression data
Gene ontology
Molecular function	protein binding; cyclin-dependent protein serine/threonine kinase inhibitor activity; protein kinase binding
Cellular component	cytoplasm; cytosol; nucleus
Biological process	cell cycle; regulation of cyclin-dependent protein serine/threonine kinase activity; oligodendrocyte differentiation; negative regulation of phosphorylation; negative regulation of cell growth; negative regulation of cell population proliferation; negative regulation of cyclin-dependent protein serine/threonine kinase activity; G1/S transition of mitotic cell cycle; negative regulation of G1/S transition of mitotic cell cycle
Sources:Amigo / QuickGO
Orthologs
Databases	NCBI: entry; OMA: entry
Species	Human	Mouse
Entrez	1031	12580
Ensembl	ENSG00000123080	ENSMUSG00000028551
UniProt	P42773	Q60772
RefSeq (mRNA)	NM_078626; NM_001262	NM_001301368; NM_007671
RefSeq (protein)	NP_001253; NP_523240	NP_001288297; NP_031697
Location (UCSC)	Chr 1: 50.96 – 50.97 Mb	Chr 4: 109.52 – 109.52 Mb
PubMed search
- Wikidata
View/Edit Human	View/Edit Mouse

Cyclin-dependent kinase 4 inhibitor C is an enzyme that in humans is encoded by the CDKN2C gene.

== Function ==
The protein encoded by this gene is a member of the INK4 family of cyclin-dependent kinase inhibitors. This protein has been shown to interact with CDK4 or CDK6, and prevent the activation of the CDK kinases, thus function as a cell growth regulator that controls cell cycle G1 progression. Ectopic expression of this gene was shown to suppress the growth of human cells in a manner that appears to correlate with the presence of a wild-type RB1 function. Studies in the knockout mice suggested the roles of this gene in regulating spermatogenesis, as well as in suppressing tumorigenesis. Two alternatively spliced transcript variants of this gene, which encode an identical protein, have been reported.

== Interactions ==
CDKN2C has been shown to interact with Cyclin-dependent kinase 4 and Cyclin-dependent kinase 6.
