= Cyclin-dependent kinase 6 =

Protein found in humans

CDK6
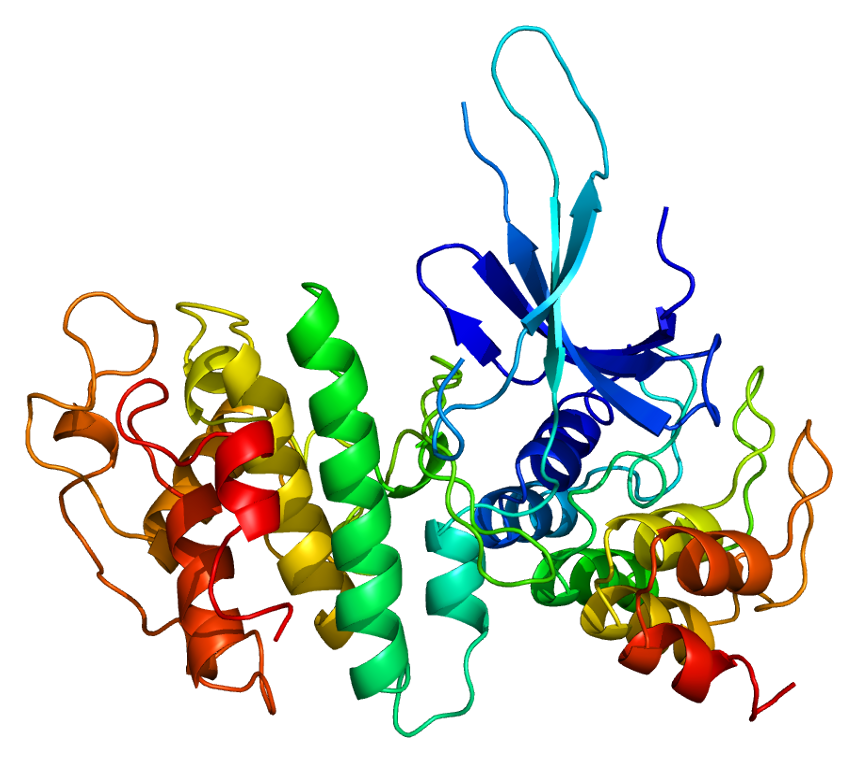

Identifiers
- Aliases: CDK6, MCPH12, PLSTIRE, cyclin-dependent kinase 6, cyclin dependent kinase 6
- External IDs: OMIM: 603368; MGI: 1277162; GeneCards: CDK6
Available structures
PDB	Ortholog search: PDBe RCSB
PDB	List of PDB id codes 1BI7, 1BI8, 1BLX, 1G3N, 1JOW, 1XO2, 2EUF, 2F2C, 3NUP, 3NUX, 4AUA, 4EZ5, 4TTH
Enzyme activity
EC #	BRENDA	ExPASy	KEGG	MetaCyc
2.7.11.22	↗	↗	↗	↗

Gene location (Human)
Chr.	Chromosome 7 (human)
Band	7q21.2	Start	92,604,921 bp
Band	7q21.2	End	92,836,573 bp

Gene location (Mouse)
Chr.	Chromosome 5 (mouse)
Band	5 A1|5 2.04 cM	Start	3,391,485 bp
Band	5 A1|5 2.04 cM	End	3,581,008 bp
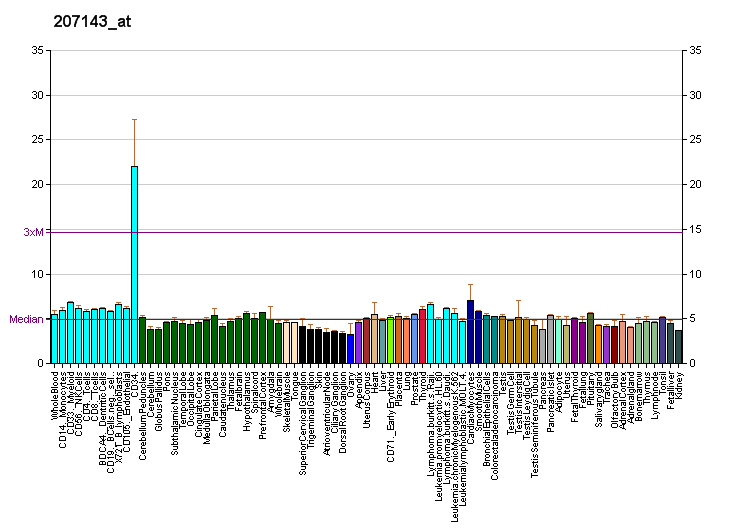
RNA expression pattern
Bgee	Human / Mouse (ortholog); Top expressed in: trabecular bone; pylorus; caput epididymis; cardia; cartilage tissue; mucosa of paranasal sinus; nipple; parietal pleura; oral cavity; mucosa of sigmoid colon / Top expressed in: gastrula; lumbar spinal ganglion; conjunctival fornix; epithelium of lens; vas deferens; human fetus; Rostral migratory stream; Paneth cell; efferent ductule; stroma of bone marrow; More reference expression data
BioGPS	More reference expression data
Gene ontology
Molecular function	transferase activity; protein kinase activity; nucleotide binding; cyclin-dependent protein serine/threonine kinase activity; kinase activity; protein serine/threonine kinase activity; protein binding; ATP binding; cyclin binding; FBXO family protein binding
Cellular component	cytoplasm; centrosome; cell projection; cyclin-dependent protein kinase holoenzyme complex; ruffle; microtubule organizing center; cytoskeleton; nucleus; cytosol; nucleoplasm; cyclin D2-CDK6 complex
Biological process	cell differentiation; lateral ventricle development; phosphorylation; positive regulation of cell-matrix adhesion; positive regulation of fibroblast proliferation; dentate gyrus development; regulation of erythrocyte differentiation; astrocyte development; negative regulation of cell differentiation; response to virus; negative regulation of cell cycle; negative regulation of osteoblast differentiation; generation of neurons; cell division; regulation of cell motility; protein phosphorylation; negative regulation of epithelial cell proliferation; regulation of gene expression; cell cycle; type B pancreatic cell development; negative regulation of myeloid cell differentiation; negative regulation of cellular senescence; gliogenesis; negative regulation of cell population proliferation; negative regulation of monocyte differentiation; signal transduction; regulation of G2/M transition of mitotic cell cycle; regulation of cell population proliferation; cell dedifferentiation; G1/S transition of mitotic cell cycle; negative regulation of transcription by RNA polymerase II; hematopoietic progenitor cell differentiation; Notch signaling pathway; positive regulation of gene expression; hemopoiesis; T cell differentiation in thymus; hematopoietic stem cell differentiation; regulation of hematopoietic stem cell differentiation; negative regulation of G1/S transition of mitotic cell cycle
Sources:Amigo / QuickGO
Orthologs
Databases	NCBI: entry; OMA: entry
Species	Human	Mouse
Entrez	1021	12571
Ensembl	ENSG00000105810	ENSMUSG00000040274
UniProt	Q00534	Q64261
RefSeq (mRNA)	NM_001145306; NM_001259	NM_009873
RefSeq (protein)	NP_001138778; NP_001250	NP_034003
Location (UCSC)	Chr 7: 92.6 – 92.84 Mb	Chr 5: 3.39 – 3.58 Mb
PubMed search
- Wikidata
View/Edit Human	View/Edit Mouse

Cell division protein kinase 6 (CDK6) is an enzyme encoded by the CDK6 gene. It is regulated by cyclins, more specifically by cyclin D proteins and cyclin-dependent kinase inhibitor proteins. The protein encoded by this gene is a member of the cyclin-dependent kinase, (CDK) family, which includes CDK4. CDK family members are highly similar to the gene products of Saccharomyces cerevisiae cdc28, and Schizosaccharomyces pombe cdc2, and are known to be important regulators of cell cycle progression in the point of regulation named R or restriction point.

This kinase is a catalytic subunit of the protein kinase complex, important for the G1 phase progression and G1/S transition of the cell cycle and the complex is composed also by an activating sub-unit; the cyclin D. The activity of this kinase first appears in mid-G1 phase, which is controlled by the regulatory subunits including D-type cyclins and members of INK4 family of CDK inhibitors. This kinase, as well as CDK4, has been shown to phosphorylate, and thus regulate the activity of, tumor suppressor retinoblastoma protein making CDK6 an important protein in cancer development.

== Structure ==
The CDK6 gene is conserved in eukaryotes, including the budding yeast and the nematode Caenorhabditis elegans. The CDK6 gene is located on chromosome 7 in humans. The gene spans 231,706 base pairs and encodes a 326 amino acid protein with a kinase function. The gene is overexpressed in cancers like lymphoma, leukemia, medulloblastoma and melanoma associated with chromosomal rearrangements. The CDK6 protein contains a catalytic core composed of a serine/threonine domain. This protein also contains an ATP-binding pocket, inhibitory and activating phosphorylation sites, a PSTAIRE-like cyclin-binding domain and an activating T-loop motif. After binding the Cyclin in the PSTAIRE helix, the protein changes its conformational structure to expose the phosphorylation motif. The protein can be found in the cytoplasm and the nucleus, however most of the active complexes are found in the nucleus of proliferating cells.

== Function ==
=== Cell cycle ===
In 1994, Matthew Meyerson and Ed Harlow investigated the product of a close analogous gene of CDK4. This gene, identified as PLSTIRE was translated into a protein that interacted with the cyclins CD1, CD2 and CD3 (same as CDK4), but that was different from CDK4; the protein was then renamed CDK6 for simplicity. In mammalian cells, cell cycle is activated by CDK6 in the early G1 phase through interactions with cyclins D1, D2 and D3. There are many changes in gene expression that are regulated through this enzyme. After the complex is formed, the C-CDK6 enzymatic complex phosphorylates the protein pRb. After its phosphorylation, pRb releases its binding partner E2F, a transcriptional activator, which in turn activates DNA replication. The CDK6 complex ensures a point of switch to commit to division responding to external signals, like mitogens and growth factors.

CDK6 is involved in a positive feedback loop that activates transcription factors through a reaction cascade. Importantly, these C-CDK complexes act as a kinase, phosphorylating and inactivating the protein of Rb and p-Rb related "pocket proteins" p107 and p130. While doing this, the CDK6 in conjunction with CDK4, act as a switch signal that first appears in G1, directing the cell towards S phase of the cell cycle.

CDK6 is important for the control of G1 to S phase transition. However, in recent years, new evidence proved that the presence of CDK6 is not essential for proliferation in every cell type, the cell cycle has a complex circuitry of regulation and the role of CDK6 might be more important in certain cell types than in others, where CDK4 or CDK2 can act as protein kinases compensating its role.

=== Cellular development ===
In mutant knockout mice of CDK6, the hematopoietic function is impaired, regardless of otherwise organism normal development. This might hint additional roles of CDK6 in the development of blood components. There are additional functions of CDK6 not associated with its kinase activity. For example, CDK6 is involved in the differentiation of T cells, acting as an inhibitor of differentiation. Even though CDK6 and CDK4 share 71% amino acid identity, this role in differentiation is unique to CDK6. CDK6 has also been found to be important in the development of other cell lines, for example, CDK6 has a role in the alteration of the morphology of astrocytes and in the development of other stem cells.

=== DNA protection ===
CDK6 differs from CDK4 in other important roles. For example, CDK6 plays a role in the accumulation of the apoptosis proteins p53 and p130, this accumulation keeps cells from entering cell division if there is DNA damage, activating pro-apoptotic pathways.

=== Metabolic homeostasis ===
Studies in the metabolic control of cells have revealed yet another role of CDK6. This new role is associated with the balance of the oxidative and non-oxidative branches of the pentose pathway in cells. This pathway is a known route altered in cancer cells, when there is an aberrant overexpression of CDK6 and CDK4. The overexpression of these proteins provides the cancer cells with a new hallmark capability of cancer; the deregulation of the cell metabolism.

=== Centrosome stability ===
In 2013, researchers discovered yet another role of CDK6. There is evidence that CDK6 associates with the centrosome and controls organized division and cell cycle phases in neuron production. When the CDK6 gene is mutated in these developing lines, the centrosomes are not properly divided, this could lead to division problems such as aneuploidy, which in turns leads to health issues like primary microcephaly.

== Mechanisms of regulation ==
CDK6 is positively regulated primarily by its union to the D cyclins D1, D2 and D3. If this subunit of the complex is not available, CDK6 is not active or available to phosphorylate the Rb substrate. An additional positive activator needed by CDK6 is the phosphorylation in a conserved threonine residue located in 177 position, this phosphorylation is done by the cdk-activating kinases, CAK. Additionally, CDK6 can be phosphorylated and activated by the Kaposi's sarcoma-associated herpesvirus, stimulating the CDK6 over activation and uncontrolled cell proliferation.

CDK6 is negatively regulated by binding to certain inhibitors that can be classified in two groups; CKIs or CIP/KIP family members like the protein p21 and p27 act blocking and inhibiting the assembled C-CDKs binding complex enzymes in their catalytic domain.

Furthermore, inhibitors of the INK4 family members like p15, p16, p18 and p19 inhibit the monomer of CDK6, preventing the complex formation.

== Clinical relevance ==
CDK6 is a protein kinase activating cell proliferation, it is involved in an important point of restriction in the cell cycle. For this reason, CDK6 and other regulators of the G1 phase of the cell cycle are known to be unbalanced in more than 80–90% of tumors. In cervical cancer cells, CDK6 function has been shown to be altered indirectly by the p16 inhibitor. CDK6 is also overexpressed in tumors that exhibit drug resistance, for example glioma malignancies exhibit resistance to chemotherapy using temozolomide (TMZ) when they have a mutation overexpressing CDK6. Likewise, the overexpression of CDK6 is also associated with resistance to hormone therapy using the anti oestrogen Fluvestrant in breast cancer.

=== Cancer ===
Loss of normal cell cycle control is the first step to developing different hallmarks of cancer; alterations of CDK6 can directly or indirectly affect the following hallmarks; dysregulated cell cellular energetics, sustaining of proliferative signaling, evading growth suppressors and inducing angiogenesis, for example, deregulation of CDK6 has been shown to be important in lymphoid malignancies by increasing angiogenesis, a hallmark of cancer. These features are reached through upregulation of CDK6 due to chromosome alterations or epigenetic dysregulations. Additionally, CDK6 might be altered through genomic instability, a mechanism of downregulation of tumor suppressor genes; this represents another evolving hallmark of cancer.

=== Medulloblastoma ===
Medulloblastoma is the most common cause of brain cancer in children. About a third of these cancers have upregulated CDK6, representing a marker for poor prognosis for this disease. Since it is so common for these cells to have alterations in CDK6, researchers are seeking for ways to downregulate CDK6 expression acting specifically in those cell lines. The MicroRNA (miR) -124 has successfully controlled cancer progression in an in-vitro setting for medulloblastoma and glioblastoma cells. Furthermore, researchers have found that it successfully reduces the growth of xenograft tumors in rat models.

=== As a drug target ===
The direct targeting of CDK6 and CDK4 should be used with caution in the treatment of cancer, because these enzymes are important for the cell cycle of normal cells as well. Furthermore, small molecules targeting these proteins might increase drug resistance events. However, these kinases have been shown to be useful as coadjuvants in breast cancer chemotherapy. Another indirect mechanism for the control of CDK6 expression, is the use of a mutated D-cyclin that binds with high affinity to CDK6, but does not induce its kinase activity. this mechanism was studied in the development of mammary tumorigenesis in rat cells, however, the clinical effects have not yet been shown in human patients.

=== Interactions ===
Cyclin-dependent kinase 6 interacts with:

- CDKN2C,
- Cyclin D1,
- Cyclin D3,
- P16,
- PPM1B, and
- PPP2CA.

== See also ==
- Cell cycle
- Cyclin-dependent kinase
- Cyclin-dependent kinase 4
- Mitosis
- The Hallmarks of Cancer
