= Cyclin-dependent kinase 4 =

Human protein

CDK4
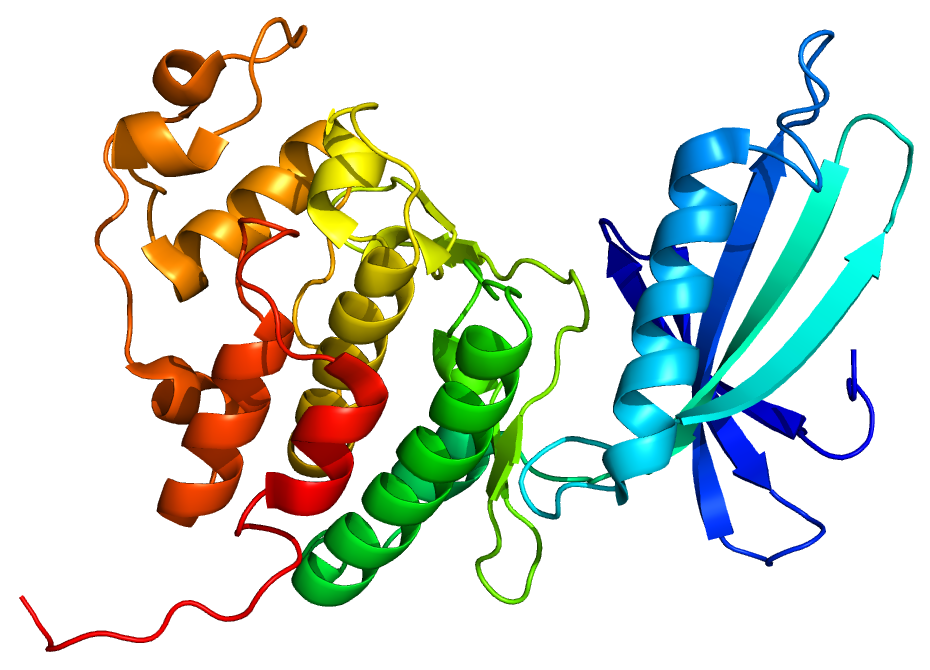

Identifiers
- Aliases: CDK4, CMM3, PSK-J3, cyclin-dependent kinase 4, cyclin dependent kinase 4
- External IDs: OMIM: 123829; MGI: 88357; GeneCards: CDK4
Available structures
PDB	Ortholog search: PDBe RCSB
PDB	List of PDB id codes 2W96, 2W99, 2W9F, 2W9Z, 3G33, 5FWL, 5FWM, 5FWK
Enzyme activity
EC #	BRENDA	ExPASy	KEGG	MetaCyc
2.7.11.22	↗	↗	↗	↗

Gene location (Human)
Chr.	Chromosome 12 (human)
Band	12q14.1	Start	57,747,727 bp
Band	12q14.1	End	57,756,013 bp
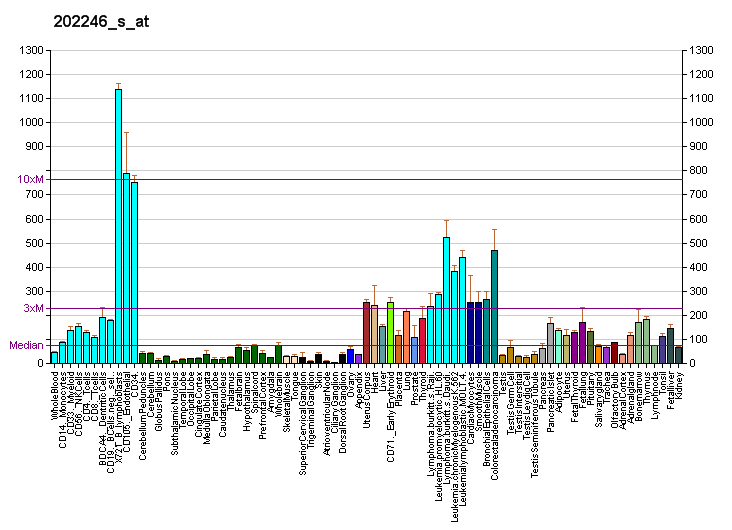
RNA expression pattern
Bgee	Human / Mouse (ortholog); Top expressed in: ganglionic eminence; ventricular zone; stromal cell of endometrium; right adrenal gland; right ovary; smooth muscle tissue; right adrenal cortex; left ovary; left adrenal gland; left adrenal cortex / n/a; More reference expression data
BioGPS	More reference expression data
Gene ontology
Molecular function	transferase activity; nucleotide binding; protein kinase activity; kinase activity; protein serine/threonine kinase activity; cyclin-dependent protein serine/threonine kinase regulator activity; protein binding; ATP binding; cyclin binding; cyclin-dependent protein serine/threonine kinase activity; protein-containing complex binding
Cellular component	cytoplasm; cytosol; cyclin-dependent protein kinase holoenzyme complex; nuclear membrane; membrane; transcription regulator complex; bicellular tight junction; nucleoplasm; nucleolus; perinuclear region of cytoplasm; chromatin; nucleus; cyclin D2-CDK4 complex; protein-containing complex
Biological process	phosphorylation; response to testosterone; positive regulation of fibroblast proliferation; response to hyperoxia; positive regulation of translation; regulation of cell cycle; cell division; protein phosphorylation; lens development in camera-type eye; regulation of cell population proliferation; response to lead ion; circadian rhythm; animal organ regeneration; positive regulation of cell population proliferation; positive regulation of cell size; positive regulation of apoptotic process; regulation of gene expression; cell cycle; positive regulation of G2/M transition of mitotic cell cycle; response to toxic substance; positive regulation of cell cycle; signal transduction; multicellular organism development; response to organic substance; cellular response to insulin stimulus; regulation of multicellular organism growth; regulation of insulin receptor signaling pathway; regulation of lipid biosynthetic process; regulation of lipid catabolic process; adipose tissue development; cellular response to lipopolysaccharide; cellular response to interleukin-4; cellular response to phorbol 13-acetate 12-myristate; cellular response to ionomycin; transcription initiation from RNA polymerase II promoter; G1/S transition of mitotic cell cycle; regulation of cyclin-dependent protein serine/threonine kinase activity; negative regulation of G1/S transition of mitotic cell cycle
Sources:Amigo / QuickGO
Orthologs
Databases	NCBI: entry; OMA: entry
Species	Human	Mouse
Entrez	1019	12567
Ensembl	ENSG00000135446	n/a
UniProt	P11802	P30285
RefSeq (mRNA)	NM_052984; NM_000075	NM_009870; NM_001355005
RefSeq (protein)	NP_000066	NP_034000; NP_001341934
Location (UCSC)	Chr 12: 57.75 – 57.76 Mb	n/a
PubMed search
- Wikidata
View/Edit Human	View/Edit Mouse

Cyclin-dependent kinase 4 (CDK4), also known as cell division protein kinase 4, is an enzyme that is encoded by the CDK4 gene in humans. CDK4 is a member of the cyclin-dependent kinase family, a group of serine/threonine kinases which regulate the cell cycle. CDK4 regulates the G1/S transition by contributing to the phosphorylation of retinoblastoma (RB) protein, which leads to the release of protein factors like E2F1 that promote S-phase progression. It is regulated by cyclins like cyclin D proteins, regulatory kinases, and cyclin kinase inhibitors (CKIs). Dysregulation of the CDK4 pathway is common in many cancers, and CDK4 is a new therapeutic target in cancer treatment.

== Structure ==
The CDK4 gene is located on chromosome 12 in humans. The gene is composed of 4,583 base pairs which together code for the 303 amino acid protein with a molecular mass of 33,730 Da. All CDK proteins, including CDK4, have two lobes: the smaller N-terminal lobe (which contains an inhibitory G-loop), and the C terminal lobe (which contains an activation domain and a T-loop). Between these two lobes is the serine/threonine kinase domain where ATP binds. In its completely inactive form, CDK4's T-loop blocks the ATP binding site, and the surrounding amino acid side chains prevent ATP binding. The kinase's activity increases when it dimerizes with the corresponding cyclin, cyclin D, which causes a conformational change at the ATP binding site. CDK activating kinase (CAK) then phosphorylates the T172 site (located on the T-loop). These two actions move the T-loop out of the active ATP-binding site and make ATP binding more favorable.

Notably, CDK6 is very related to CDK4 in both structure and function. They share 71% of their amino acids and both regulate the G1/S transition by phosphorylating Rb. CDK4 and 6 differ in their cellular localization and other off-pathway roles, however are commonly referred together as CDK4/6.

The CDK4 protein is similar to the fungi gene products of S. cerevisiae cdc28 and S. pombe cdc2.

== Function ==
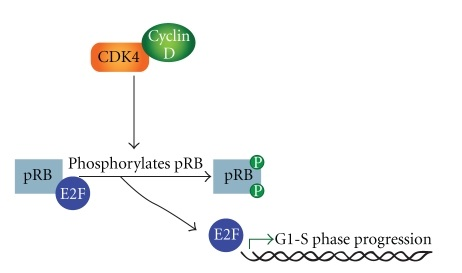
Role of CDK4, cyklin D, Rb and E2F in cell cycle regulation.

CDK4 is the catalytic subunit of the protein-kinase complex CDK4-cyclin D, which plays a role in G1/S cell cycle progression. During G1 phase, the cell grows and prepares for the DNA replication that occurs in the S phase. There is a G1/S checkpoint which acts as a committed step to enter S-phase. This checkpoint ensures that cells moving toward mitosis are large enough and do not have DNA damage that could be passed on to daughter cells.

There are two models of CDK4 cell cycle regulation. The older model proposes that the kinase is responsible for the phosphorylation of retinoblastoma gene product (Rb). The Ser/Thr-kinase component of cyclin D-CDK4 (DC) forms complexes that phosphorylate and inhibit members of the retinoblastoma (RB) protein family including RB1 and regulate the cell-cycle during G1/S transition. Phosphorylation of RB1 allows dissociation of the transcription factor E2F from the RB/E2F complexes and the subsequent transcription of E2F target genes which are responsible for the progression through the G1 phase. In this model, CDK4 inhibits Rb, which inhibits E2F, which promotes progression into S phase.

The newer model, as proposed in a 2014 paper by Narasimha et al., The CDK4-cyclin D complex phosphorylates the retinoblastoma tumor suppressor protein (Rb) and its related proteins p107 and p130, which go on to inhibit cell cycle progression. As a kinase, the CDK4 serine/threonine active site converts ATP to ADP and transfers the removed phosphate group to Rb. Rb is mono-phosphorylated in early G1 by the CDK4-cyclin D complex. When mono-phosphorylated, Rb exists as one of the 14 isoforms, which bind to protein factors like E1a, and proteins in the E2F family.

The new model of CDK4 regulation posits that at the G1/S checkpoint, if a cell seems healthy, CDK2 (a different cyclin dependent kinase) inactivates Rb, and these protein factors are released back into the cell. E2F proteins then activate the transcription of genes that cause S-phase progression. However, if at the G1/S checkpoint a cell detects DNA damage, it will respond by activating the CDK4-cyclin D complex to mono-phosphorylate, and activate Rb. This prevents Rb from dissociating from E2F proteins, which prevents them from activating the transcription of the S-phase progression genes.

While CDK4 primarily regulates the cell cycle through phosphorylation of Rb, there is evidence of a secondary, more direct role independent of Rb. CDK4 may be able to directly phosphorylate transcription factors and co-regulators like Smad3, MYC, FOXM1, and MEP50 to regulate the cell cycle, survival and senescence.

Interestingly, CDK4-null mutant mice are viable, and in-vitro experiments show that cell proliferation is not significantly affected, likely due to compensatory roles played by other CDKs. However, CDK plays a significant role in cancer development.

== Mechanisms of regulation ==
CDK4 is only active during the G1-S phase, controlled by cyclin D and CDK inhibitors. CDK activity is negatively regulated by cyclin kinase inhibitors (CKIs), which belong to one of two families. The INK4 family of CKIs are inhibitors which bind and inhibit CDK4/6, also preventing subsequent binding to cyclin D. The Cip/Kip family inhibitors are not specific to CDK4/6, and instead bind and inhibit the cyclin-CDK complex.

CDK4 activity is positively regulated by cyclin D, which creates a conformational change in CDK4 that opens the active site for kinase activity. Cyclins are proteins that change concentration periodically during the cell cycle. They are extremely specific and diverse, which serves to regulate the cell cycle with precision. Cyclin D levels oscillate during the G1 phase, first increasing and accumulating, then rapidly decreasing during the transition to the S phase. Cyclin D levels are stimulated by growth factors, without which cyclin D levels would stay low regardless of cell cycle stage. After its role in G1 is complete, cyclin D is translocated from the nucleus to the cytoplasm in S phase, modulating the nuclear cyclin D levels, and therefore modulating the activity of CDK4 to promote the S phase transition.

== Clinical significance ==
=== Cancer ===
Cancer's hallmark characteristic of uncontrolled cell proliferation is believed to result from disturbances to mechanisms that usually control cell proliferation (tumor suppressors) and mechanisms that normally encourage cell proliferation (proto-oncogenes). Cell cycle regulation mechanisms called checkpoints, like G1/S, are in place to prevent this uncontrolled division.

Mutations in the CDK4 gene as well as in its related proteins including D-type cyclins, p16(INK4a), CDKN2A and Rb were all found to be associated with tumorigenesis of a variety of cancers, including sarcomas, gliomas, lymphomas and tumors of the mammary gland. One specific point mutation of CDK4 (R24C) was first identified in melanoma patients. This mutation was introduced also in animal models and its role as a cancer driver oncogene was studied thoroughly. Nowadays, deregulated CDK4 is considered to be a potential therapeutic target in some cancer types and various CDK4 inhibitors are being tested for cancer treatment in clinical trials. Multiple polyadenylation sites of this gene have been reported.

Cyclin D and CDK4/6 activities are observed to be up-regulated in certain cancers, sparking interest in the development of small-molecule inhibitors of CDK4/6. Ribociclib are US FDA approved CDK4 and CDK6 inhibitors for the treatment of estrogen receptor positive/ HER2 negative advanced breast cancer.

=== HIV ===
There is some evidence that CDK4 plays a role in the HIV-1 restriction pathway in primary microphages. Cell cycle control plays a major role in determining susceptibility to HIV-1 infection. Active CDKs phosphorylate SAMHD1, deactivating the enzyme which usually can restrict HIV-1 replication. A complex formed by cyclin D2-CDK4-p21 lowers the amount of active CDK in the cell, allowing SAMHD1 to exist in its active, dephosphorylated form that restricts HIV-1 replication.

== Interactions ==
Cyclin-dependent kinase 4 has been shown to interact with:

- CDC37,
- CDKN1B,
- CDKN2B,
- CDKN2C,
- CEBPA,
- CCND1,
- CCND3,
- DBNL,
- MyoD,
- P16,
- PCNA, and
- SERTAD1.

Overview of signal transduction pathways involved in apoptosis. (CDK4 in the (pink) nucleus)
