= Cyclin A =

Protein family

cyclin A1

Identifiers
- Symbol: CCNA1
- NCBI gene: 8900
- HGNC: 1577
- OMIM: 604036
- RefSeq: NM_003914
- UniProt: P78396

Other data
- Locus: Chr. 13 q12.3-q13
Search for
- Structures: Swiss-model
- Domains: InterPro

cyclin A2

Identifiers
- Symbol: CCNA2
- Alt. symbols: CCNA, CCN1
- NCBI gene: 890
- HGNC: 1578
- OMIM: 123835
- RefSeq: NM_001237
- UniProt: P20248

Other data
- Locus: Chr. 4 q27
Search for
- Structures: Swiss-model
- Domains: InterPro

Cyclin A is a member of the cyclin family, a group of proteins that function in regulating progression through the cell cycle. The stages that a cell passes through that culminate in its division and replication are collectively known as the cell cycle Since the successful division and replication of a cell is essential for its survival, the cell cycle is tightly regulated by several components to ensure the efficient and error-free progression through the cell cycle. One such regulatory component is cyclin A which plays a role in the regulation of two different cell cycle stages.

== Types ==
Cyclin A was first identified in 1983 in sea urchin embryos. Since its initial discovery, homologues of cyclin A have been identified in numerous eukaryotes including Drosophila, Xenopus, mice, and in humans but has not been found in lower eukaryotes like yeast. The protein exists in both an embryonic form and somatic form. A single cyclin A gene has been identified in Drosophila while Xenopus, mice and humans contain two distinct types of cyclin A: A1, the embryonic-specific form, and A2, the somatic form. Cyclin A1 is prevalently expressed during meiosis and early on in embryogenesis. Cyclin A2 is expressed in dividing somatic cells.

== Role in cell cycle progression ==
Expression of human cyclins through the cell cycle

Cyclin A, along with the other members of the cyclin family, regulates cell cycle progression through physically interacting with cyclin-dependent kinases (CDKs), which thereby activates the enzymatic activity of its CDK partner.

=== CDK partner association ===
The interaction between the cyclin box, a region conserved across cyclins, and a region of the CDK, called the PSTAIRE, confers the foundation of the cyclin-CDK complex. Cyclin A is the only cyclin that regulates multiple steps of the cell cycle. Cyclin A can regulate multiple cell cycle steps because it associates with, and thereby activates, two distinct CDKs – CDK2 and CDK1. Depending on which CDK partner cyclin A binds, the cell will continue through the S phase or it will transition from G_{2} to the M phase. Association of cyclin A with CDK2 is required for passage into S phase while association with CDK1 is required for entry into M phase.

=== S phase ===
Cyclin A resides in the nucleus during S phase where it is involved in the initiation and completion of DNA replication. As the cell passes from G_{1} into S phase, cyclin A associates with CDK2, replacing cyclin E. Cyclin E is responsible for initiating the assembly of the pre-replication complex. This complex makes chromatin capable of replication. When the amount of cyclin A/CDK2 complex reaches a threshold level, it terminates the assembly of the pre-replication complex made by cyclin E/CDK2. As the amount of Cyclin A/CDK2 complex increases, the complex initiates DNA replication.

Cyclin A has a second function in S phase. In addition to initiating DNA synthesis, Cyclin A ensures that DNA is replicated once per cell cycle by preventing the assembly of additional replication complexes. This is thought to occur through the phosphorylation of particular DNA replication machinery components, such as CDC6, by the cyclin A/CDK2 complex. Since the action of cyclin A/CDK2 inhibits that of cyclin E/CDK2, the sequential activation of cyclin E followed by the activation of cyclin A is important and tightly regulated in S phase.

=== G_{2} / M phase ===
In late S phase, cyclin A can also associate with CDK1. Cyclin A remains associated with CDK1 from late S into late G_{2} phase when it is replaced by cyclin B. Cyclin A/CDK1 is thought to be involved in the activation and stabilization of cyclin B/CDK1 complex. Once cyclin B is activated, cyclin A is no longer needed and is subsequently degraded through the ubiquitin pathway. Degradation of cyclin A/CDK1 induces mitotic exit.

Cyclin A/CDK2 complex was thought to be restricted to the nucleus and thus exclusively involved in S phase progression. New research has since debunked this assumption, shedding light on cyclin A/CDK2 migration to the centrosomes in late G_{2}. Cyclin A binds to the mitotic spindle poles in the centrosome however, the mechanism by which the complex is shuttled to the centrosome is not well understood. It is suspected that the presence of cyclin A/CDK2 at the centrosomes may confer a means of regulating the movement of cyclin B/CDK1 to the centrosome and thus the timing of mitotic events.

A study in 2008 provided further evidence of cyclin A/CDK2 complex's role in mitosis. Cells were modified so their CDK2 was inhibited and their cyclin A2 gene was knocked out. These mutants entered mitosis late due to a delayed activation of the cyclin B/CDK1 complex. Coupling of microtubule nucleation in the centrosome with mitotic events in the nucleus was lost in the cyclin A knockout/CDK2 inhibited mutant cells.

Cyclin A has been shown to play a crucial role in the G_{2}/M transition in Drosophila and Xenopus embryos.

== Regulation ==
Transcription of cyclin A is tightly regulated and synchronized with cell cycle progression. Initiation of transcription of cyclin A is coordinated with passage of the R point, a critical transition point that is required for progression from G_{1} into S phase. Transcription peaks and plateaus mid-S phase and abruptly declines in late G_{2}.

=== E2F and pRb ===
Transcription of cyclin A is predominantly regulated by the transcription factor E2F in a negative feedback loop. E2F is responsible for initiating the transcription of many critical S phase genes. Cyclin A transcription is off during most of G_{1} and the begins shortly after the R point.

The retinoblastoma protein (pRb) is involved in the regulation of cyclin A through its interaction with E2F. It exists in two states: hypophosphorylated pRb and hyperphosphorylated pRb. Hypophosphorylated pRb binds E2F, which prevents transcription of cyclin A. The absence of cyclin A prior to the R point is due to the inhibition of E2F by hypophosphorylated pRb. After the cell passes through the R point, cyclin D/E- complexes phosphorylate pRb. Hyperphosphorylated pRb can no longer bind E2F, E2F is released and cyclin A genes, and other crucial genes for S phase, are transcribed.

E2F initiates transcription of cyclin A by de-repressing the promoter. The promoter is bound by a repressor molecule called the cell-cycle-responsive element (CCRE). E2F binds to an E2F binding site on the CCRE, releasing the repressor from the promoter and allowing the transcription of cyclin A. Cyclin A/CDK2 will eventually phosphorylate E2F when cyclin A reaches a certain level, completing the negative feedback loop. Phosphorylation of E2F turns the transcription factor off, providing another level of controlling the transcription of cyclin A.

=== p53 and p21 ===
Transcription of cyclin A is indirectly regulated by the tumor suppressor protein p53. P53 is activated by DNA damage and turns on several downstream pathways, including cell cycle arrest. Cell cycle arrest is carried out by the p53-pRb pathway. Activated p53 turns on genes for p21. P21 is a CDK inhibitor that binds to several cyclin/CDK complexes, including cyclin A-CDK2/1 and cyclin D/CDK4, and blocks the kinase activity of CDKs. Activated p21 can bind cyclin D/CDK4 and render it incapable of phosphorylating pRb. PRb remains hypophosphorylated and binds E2F. E2F is unable to activate the transcription of cyclins involved in cell cycle progression, such as cyclin A and the cell cycle is arrested at G_{1}. Cell cycle arrest allows the cell to repair DNA damage before the cell divides and passes damaged DNA to daughter cells.
