= TFAP2E =

Mammalian protein found in humans

Identifiers
- Aliases: TFAP2E, AP2E, transcription factor AP-2 epsilon, AP-2epsilon
- External IDs: OMIM: 614428; MGI: 2679630; GeneCards: TFAP2E

Gene location (Human)
Chr.	Chromosome 1 (human)
Band	1p34.3	Start	35,573,314 bp
Band	1p34.3	End	35,595,328 bp

Gene location (Mouse)
Chr.	Chromosome 4 (mouse)
Band	4|4 D2.2	Start	126,609,799 bp
Band	4|4 D2.2	End	126,630,033 bp
RNA expression pattern
Bgee	Human / Mouse (ortholog); Top expressed in: cerebellar hemisphere; right hemisphere of cerebellum; testicle; right frontal lobe; Brodmann area 9; C1 segment; granulocyte; nucleus accumbens; skin of leg; anterior cingulate cortex / Top expressed in: primary oocyte; zygote; secondary oocyte; hair follicle; Jacobson's organ; lip; neural groove; skin of external ear; blastocyst; skin of back; More reference expression data
BioGPS	n/a
Gene ontology
Molecular function	DNA-binding transcription factor activity; RNA polymerase II cis-regulatory region sequence-specific DNA binding; DNA binding; DNA-binding transcription activator activity, RNA polymerase II-specific; RNA polymerase II transcription regulatory region sequence-specific DNA binding; protein homodimerization activity; protein heterodimerization activity; DNA-binding transcription factor activity, RNA polymerase II-specific
Cellular component	nucleus
Biological process	regulation of transcription, DNA-templated; regulation of cell population proliferation; transcription by RNA polymerase II; transcription, DNA-templated; positive regulation of transcription by RNA polymerase II; anatomical structure development; regulation of transcription by RNA polymerase II
Sources:Amigo / QuickGO
Orthologs
Databases	NCBI: entry; OMA: entry
Species	Human	Mouse
Entrez	339488	332937
Ensembl	ENSG00000116819	ENSMUSG00000042477
UniProt	Q6VUC0	Q6VUP9
RefSeq (mRNA)	NM_178548	NM_198960
RefSeq (protein)	NP_848643	NP_945198
Location (UCSC)	Chr 1: 35.57 – 35.6 Mb	Chr 4: 126.61 – 126.63 Mb
PubMed search
- Wikidata
View/Edit Human	View/Edit Mouse

Transcription factor AP-2 epsilon (activating enhancer binding protein 2 epsilon), also known as TFAP2E, is a human gene. The protein encoded by this gene is a transcription factor.

== See also ==
- Activating protein 2
