= HPH-15 =

Antifibrotic drug

HPH-15 is an antifibrotic drug with higher AMPK-activation activity than metformin.

The cellular target of this compound is still being investigated, but binding and knockout studies suggest that it is heterogeneous nuclear ribonucleoprotein U. By binding to this nuclear ribonucleoprotein the expression of many proteins can be affected indirectly, by changing mRNA processing.
