= GPS2 =

GPS2 may refer to:

- GPS2 (gene)
- Global Positioning System
