= Cyclin A2 =

Protein-coding gene in the species Homo sapiens

CCNA2
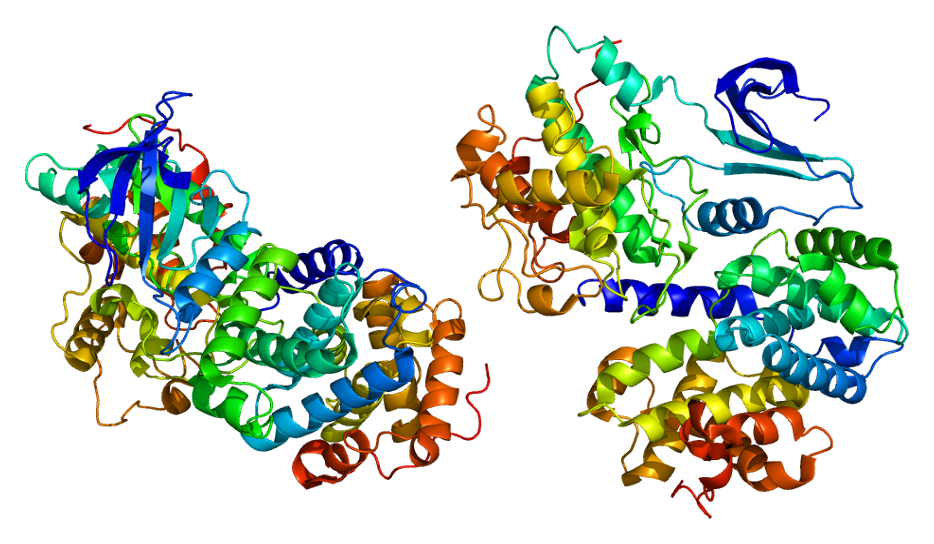

Identifiers
- Aliases: CCNA2, CCN1, CCNA, cyclin A2
- External IDs: OMIM: 123835; MGI: 108069; GeneCards: CCNA2
Available structures
PDB	Ortholog search: PDBe RCSB
PDB	List of PDB id codes 1E9H, 1FIN, 1FVV, 1GY3, 1H1P, 1H1Q, 1H1R, 1H1S, 1H24, 1H25, 1H26, 1H27, 1H28, 1JST, 1JSU, 1OGU, 1OI9, 1OIU, 1OIY, 1OKV, 1OKW, 1OL1, 1OL2, 1P5E, 1PKD, 1QMZ, 1URC, 1VYW, 2BKZ, 2BPM, 2C4G, 2C5N, 2C5O, 2C5V, 2C5X, 2C6T, 2CCH, 2CCI, 2CJM, 2I40, 2IW6, 2IW8, 2IW9, 2UUE, 2UZB, 2UZD, 2UZE, 2UZL, 2V22, 2WEV, 2WFY, 2WHB, 2WIH, 2WIP, 2WMA, 2WMB, 2WPA, 2WXV, 2X1N, 3EID, 3EJ1, 3EOC, 3F5X, 4BCK, 4BCM, 4BCN, 4BCP, 4CFM, 4CFN, 4CFU, 4CFV, 4CFW, 4CFX, 4EOI, 4EOJ, 4EOK, 4EOL, 4EOM, 4EON, 4EOO, 4EOP, 4EOQ, 4EOR, 4EOS, 4FX3, 5CYI, 5IF1

Gene location (Human)
Chr.	Chromosome 4 (human)
Band	4q27	Start	121,816,444 bp
Band	4q27	End	121,823,883 bp

Gene location (Mouse)
Chr.	Chromosome 3 (mouse)
Band	3 B|3 17.67 cM	Start	36,619,014 bp
Band	3 B|3 17.67 cM	End	36,626,299 bp
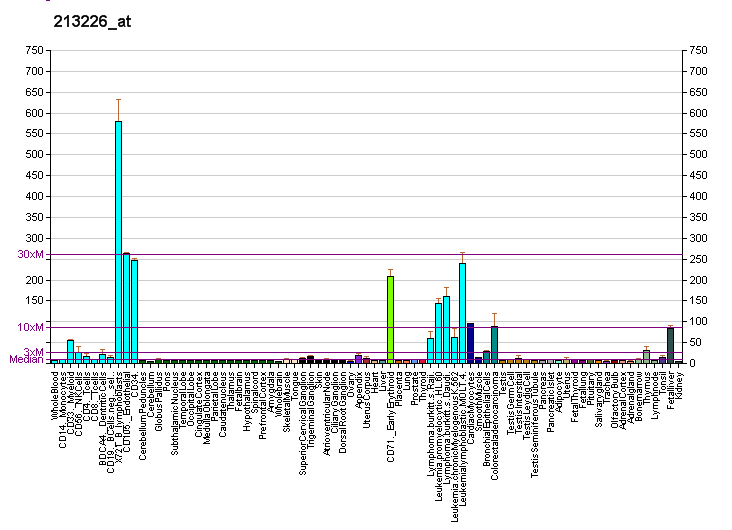

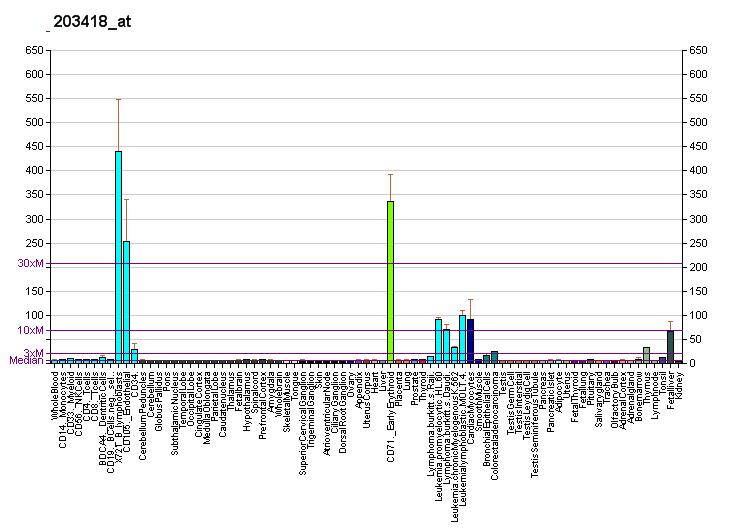
RNA expression pattern
Bgee	Human / Mouse (ortholog); Top expressed in: ventricular zone; oocyte; secondary oocyte; ganglionic eminence; gonad; bone marrow; stromal cell of endometrium; rectum; mucosa of transverse colon; trabecular bone / Top expressed in: fetal liver hematopoietic progenitor cell; genital tubercle; tail of embryo; Paneth cell; somite; ventricular zone; maxillary prominence; mandibular prominence; ureter; epiblast; More reference expression data
BioGPS	More reference expression data
Gene ontology
Molecular function	protein binding; protein kinase binding; cyclin-dependent protein kinase activity; protein domain specific binding; protein kinase activity; cyclin-dependent protein serine/threonine kinase regulator activity
Cellular component	cytoplasm; female pronucleus; male pronucleus; nucleoplasm; nucleus; cyclin-dependent protein kinase holoenzyme complex; cytosol; cyclin A2-CDK2 complex
Biological process	cochlea development; cellular response to luteinizing hormone stimulus; response to estradiol; response to glucagon; positive regulation of fibroblast proliferation; cellular response to estradiol stimulus; cellular response to organic cyclic compound; cellular response to insulin-like growth factor stimulus; cellular response to platelet-derived growth factor stimulus; cellular response to leptin stimulus; cell division; positive regulation of transcription, DNA-templated; animal organ regeneration; cellular response to nitric oxide; cell cycle; Ras protein signal transduction; viral process; cellular response to hypoxia; cellular response to cocaine; G2/M transition of mitotic cell cycle; protein deubiquitination; cell cycle G1/S phase transition; regulation of cell cycle; regulation of cyclin-dependent protein serine/threonine kinase activity; mitotic cell cycle; regulation of DNA replication; regulation of mitotic nuclear division; positive regulation of cell population proliferation; positive regulation of cell cycle
Sources:Amigo / QuickGO
Orthologs
Databases	NCBI: entry; OMA: entry
Species	Human	Mouse
Entrez	890	12428
Ensembl	ENSG00000145386	ENSMUSG00000027715
UniProt	P20248	P51943
RefSeq (mRNA)	NM_001237	NM_009828
RefSeq (protein)	NP_001228	NP_033958
Location (UCSC)	Chr 4: 121.82 – 121.82 Mb	Chr 3: 36.62 – 36.63 Mb
PubMed search
- Wikidata
View/Edit Human	View/Edit Mouse

Cyclin-A2 is a protein that in humans is encoded by the CCNA2 gene. It is one of the two types of cyclin A: cyclin A1 is expressed during meiosis and embryogenesis while cyclin A2 is expressed in the mitotic division of somatic cells.

== Function ==
Cyclin A2 belongs to the cyclin family, whose members regulate cell cycle progression by interacting with CDK kinases. Cyclin A2 is unique in that it can activate two different CDK kinases; it binds CDK2 during S phase, and CDK1 during the transition from G2 to M phase.

Cyclin A2 is synthesized at the onset of S phase and localizes to the nucleus, where the cyclin A2-CDK2 complex is implicated in the initiation and progression of DNA synthesis. Phosphorylation of CDC6 and MCM4 by the cyclin A2-CDK2 complex prevents re-replication of DNA during the cell cycle.

Cyclin A2 is involved in the G2/M transition but it cannot independently form a maturation promoting factor (MPF). Recent studies have shown that the cyclin A2-CDK1 complex triggers cyclin B1-CDK1 activation which results in chromatin condensation and the breakdown of the nuclear envelope.

== Regulation ==
The levels of cyclin A2 are tightly synchronized with the progression of the cell cycle. Transcription initiates in late G1, peaks and plateaus in mid-S, and declines in G2.

Cyclin A2 transcription is mostly regulated by the transcription factor E2F and begins in G1, after the R point. Absence of cyclin A2 before the R point is due to the E2F inhibition by hypophosphorylated retinoblastoma protein (pRb). After the R point, pRb is phosphorylated and can no longer bind E2F, leading to cyclin A2 transcription. The cyclin A2-CDK2 complex eventually phosphorylates E2F, turning off cyclin A2 transcription. E2F promotes cyclin A2 transcription by de-repressing the promoter.

== Interactions ==
Cyclin A2 has been shown to interact with:

- CDC6,
- E2F1,
- FEN1,
- ITGB3BP,
- RBL1, and
- SKP2.

== DNA Repair ==
Cyclin A2 regulates homologous recombinational DNA repair in human breast cancer cells Loss of cyclin A2 causes high rates of double-strand breaks in DNA. The increase in double-strand breaks is a consequence of defective homologous recombinational repair of the breaks resulting from reduced MRE11 and RAD51 DNA repair proteins. Cyclin A2 mediates the abundance of MRE11 nuclease by binding to Mre11 mRNA. Cyclin A2 mediates the abundance of RAD51 protein by inhibiting proteasome degradation of this protein.

During mouse development and aging, cyclin A2 promotes DNA repair, particularly double-strand break repair, in the brain. Also in mice, cyclin A2 was found to be an RNA binding protein that controls the translation of Mre11 mRNA.

== Clinical significance ==
Cyclin A2 (Ccna2) is a key protein involved in the direction of mammalian cardiac myocytes to grow and divide, and has been shown to induce cardiac repair following myocardial infarction. Normally, Ccna2 is silenced postnatally in mammalian cardiac myocytes. Because of this gene silencing, adult heart muscle cells cannot divide readily to repair and regenerate after a heart attack.

Ccna2 has been found to induce cardiac repair in small-animal models following myocardial infarction. Preclinical trials involving injections of adenovirus which contained the Ccna2 gene into infarcted porcine (pig) hearts has shown to be protective of MI in pig hearts. Ccna2 mediated cardiac repair showed both a decrease in fibrosis in the peri-infarct tissue and a greater number of cardiomyocytes at the sites of injection. Delivery of Ccna2 into cardiac tissue invokes a regenerative response and markedly enhances cardiac function.

== Cancer ==
Increased expression of cyclin A2 has been observed in many types of cancer such as breast, cervical, liver, and lung among others. While it is not clear whether increased expression of cyclin A2 is a cause or result of tumorigenesis, it is indicative of prognostic values such as predictions of survival or relapse.

Overexpression of cyclin A2 in mammalian cells can result in the delayed onset of metaphase and anaphase. It is also possible that cyclin A2-CDK contributes to tumorigenesis by the phosphorylation of oncoproteins or tumor suppressors like p53.

== See also ==
- Cyclin A
