= Firre =

Non-coding RNA in the species Homo sapiens

FIRRE

Identifiers
- Aliases: FIRRE, LINC01200, functional intergenic repeating RNA element, firre intergenic repeating RNA element
- External IDs: OMIM: 300999; MGI: 2147989; GeneCards: FIRRE

Gene location (Human)
Chr.	X chromosome (human)
Band	Xq26.2	Start	131,688,779 bp
Band	Xq26.2	End	131,830,862 bp

Gene location (Mouse)
Chr.	X chromosome (mouse)
Band	X|X A5	Start	49,644,621 bp
Band	X|X A5	End	49,724,198 bp
RNA expression pattern
Bgee	Human / Mouse (ortholog); Top expressed in: epithelium of colon; sural nerve; testicle; body of pancreas; gonad; bone marrow cell; C1 segment; ventricular zone; monocyte; granulocyte / Top expressed in: neural layer of retina; choroidal fissure; fourth ventricle; choroid plexus of fourth ventricle; esophagus; superior frontal gyrus; cerebellar cortex; otolith organ; utricle; epiblast; More reference expression data
BioGPS	n/a
Orthologs
Databases	NCBI: entry; OMA: entry
Species	Human	Mouse
Entrez	286467	103012
Ensembl	ENSG00000213468	ENSMUSG00000085396
UniProt	n a	n/a
RefSeq (mRNA)	n/a	n/a
RefSeq (protein)	n/a	n/a
Location (UCSC)	Chr X: 131.69 – 131.83 Mb	Chr X: 49.64 – 49.72 Mb
PubMed search
- Wikidata
View/Edit Human	View/Edit Mouse

Firre (functional intergenic repeating RNA element) is a long non-coding RNA located on chromosome X. It is retained in the nucleus via interaction with the nuclear matrix factor hnRNPU. It mediates trans-chromosomal interactions and anchors the inactive X chromosome to the nucleolus. It plays a role in pluripotency and adipogenesis.

== See also ==
- Long non-coding RNA
