= TFAP2D =

Mammalian protein found in Homo sapiens

Identifiers
- Aliases: TFAP2D, TFAP2BL1, transcription factor AP-2 delta, AP-2delta
- External IDs: OMIM: 610161; MGI: 2153466; GeneCards: TFAP2D

Gene location (Human)
Chr.	Chromosome 6 (human)
Band	6p12.3	Start	50,713,526 bp
Band	6p12.3	End	50,773,033 bp

Gene location (Mouse)
Chr.	Chromosome 1 (mouse)
Band	1|1 A3	Start	19,173,246 bp
Band	1|1 A3	End	19,236,570 bp
RNA expression pattern
Bgee	Human / Mouse (ortholog); Top expressed in: oocyte; buccal mucosa cell; secondary oocyte; testicle; ganglionic eminence; ventral tegmental area; amygdala; superior frontal gyrus; prefrontal cortex; dorsolateral prefrontal cortex / Top expressed in: urethra; female urethra; male urethra; inferior colliculi; myocardium of atrium; embryo; ganglionic eminence; neural layer of retina; primordial ventricle; lumbar spinal ganglion; More reference expression data
BioGPS	n/a
Gene ontology
Molecular function	DNA-binding transcription factor activity; DNA binding; RNA polymerase II transcription regulatory region sequence-specific DNA binding; DNA-binding transcription factor activity, RNA polymerase II-specific
Cellular component	nucleus; transcription regulator complex
Biological process	negative regulation of neuron apoptotic process; positive regulation of transcription, DNA-templated; regulation of transcription, DNA-templated; regulation of cell population proliferation; inferior colliculus development; transcription, DNA-templated; positive regulation of transcription by RNA polymerase II; anatomical structure development; regulation of transcription by RNA polymerase II
Sources:Amigo / QuickGO
Orthologs
Databases	NCBI: entry; OMA: entry
Species	Human	Mouse
Entrez	83741	226896
Ensembl	ENSG00000008197	ENSMUSG00000042596
UniProt	Q7Z6R9	Q91ZK0
RefSeq (mRNA)	NM_172238	NM_153154; NM_001379073; NM_001379074
RefSeq (protein)	NP_758438	NP_694794; NP_001366002; NP_001366003
Location (UCSC)	Chr 6: 50.71 – 50.77 Mb	Chr 1: 19.17 – 19.24 Mb
PubMed search
- Wikidata
View/Edit Human	View/Edit Mouse

Transcription factor AP-2 delta (activating enhancer binding protein 2 delta), also known as TFAP2D, is a human gene. The protein encoded by this gene is a transcription factor.

== See also ==
- Activating protein 2
