= EP300 =

Protein-coding gene in the species Homo sapiens

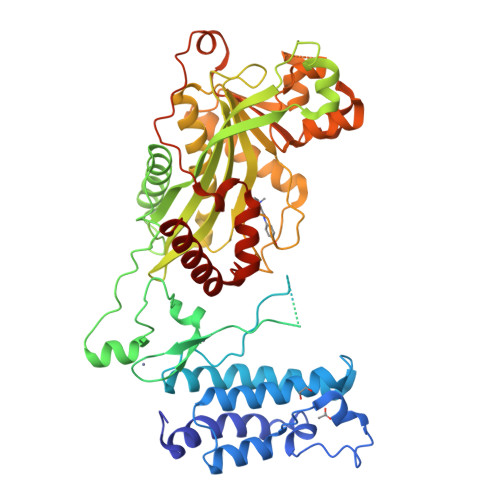

Identifiers
- Aliases: EP300, KAT3B, RSTS2, p300, E1A binding protein p300, MKHK2
- External IDs: OMIM: 602700; MGI: 1276116; GeneCards: EP300
Available structures
PDB	Ortholog search: PDBe RCSB
PDB	List of PDB id codes 1L3E, 1P4Q, 2K8F, 2MH0, 2MZD, 3BIY, 3I3J, 3IO2, 3P57, 3T92, 4BHW, 4PZR, 4PZS, 4PZT, 5BT3
Enzyme activity
EC #	BRENDA	ExPASy	KEGG	MetaCyc
2.3.1.48	↗	↗	↗	↗

Gene location (Human)
Chr.	Chromosome 22 (human)
Band	22q13.2	Start	41,092,592 bp
Band	22q13.2	End	41,180,077 bp

Gene location (Mouse)
Chr.	Chromosome 15 (mouse)
Band	15|15 E1	Start	81,469,552 bp
Band	15|15 E1	End	81,536,278 bp
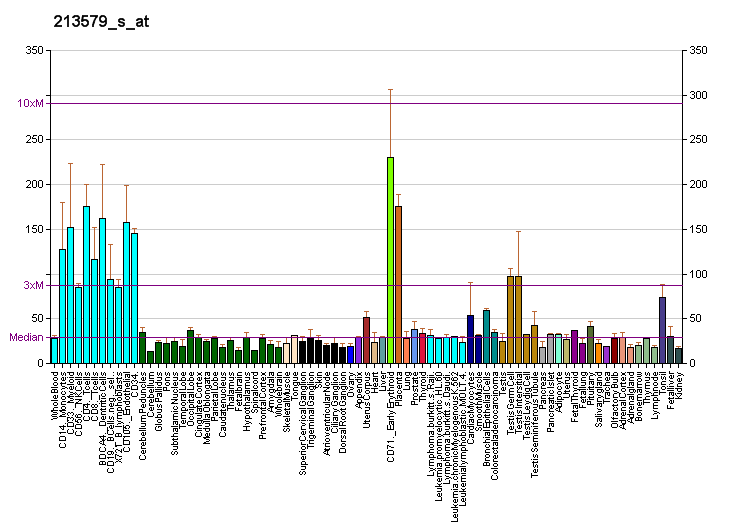

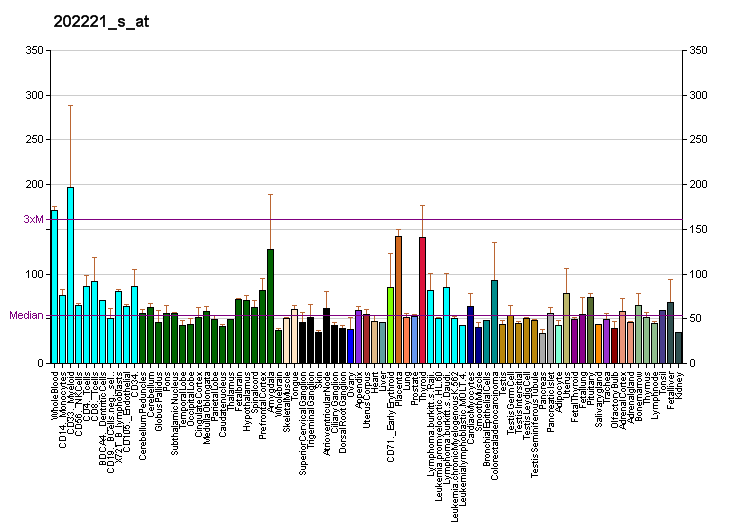
RNA expression pattern
Bgee	Human / Mouse (ortholog); Top expressed in: epithelium of colon; bone marrow cell; lower lobe of lung; tonsil; testicle; visceral pleura; ventricular zone; parietal pleura; corpus callosum; monocyte / Top expressed in: tail of embryo; genital tubercle; gastrula; zygote; granulocyte; mesenteric lymph nodes; hand; submandibular gland; spleen; secondary oocyte; More reference expression data
BioGPS	More reference expression data
Gene ontology
Molecular function	protein C-terminus binding; transcription factor binding; transcription coregulator activity; metal ion binding; acyltransferase activity; transferase activity; beta-catenin binding; pre-mRNA intronic binding; zinc ion binding; chromatin binding; damaged DNA binding; protein binding; acetyltransferase activity; DNA binding; DNA-binding transcription activator activity, RNA polymerase II-specific; transcription coactivator activity; p53 binding; androgen receptor binding; chromatin DNA binding; histone acetyltransferase activity; lysine N-acetyltransferase activity, acting on acetyl phosphate as donor; peptide N-acetyltransferase activity; peptide-lysine-N-acetyltransferase activity; protein propionyltransferase activity; STAT family protein binding; peptide butyryltransferase activity; histone crotonyltransferase activity; histone butyryltransferase activity; RNA polymerase II cis-regulatory region sequence-specific DNA binding
Cellular component	nucleus; histone acetyltransferase complex; transcription regulator complex; nucleoplasm; cytoplasm; cytosol; chromosome
Biological process	somitogenesis; rhythmic process; transcription by RNA polymerase II; histone H2B acetylation; animal organ morphogenesis; cell cycle; B cell differentiation; apoptotic process; regulation of transcription, DNA-templated; lung development; N-terminal peptidyl-lysine acetylation; platelet formation; stimulatory C-type lectin receptor signaling pathway; transcription, DNA-templated; positive regulation of transcription, DNA-templated; development of the heart; regulation of transcription from RNA polymerase II promoter in response to hypoxia; viral process; protein acetylation; Notch signaling pathway; cellular response to UV; protein stabilization; positive regulation of DNA-binding transcription factor activity; negative regulation of transcription by RNA polymerase II; nervous system development; regulation of autophagy; regulation of androgen receptor signaling pathway; positive regulation of protein binding; positive regulation of transcription from RNA polymerase II promoter involved in unfolded protein response; fat cell differentiation; positive regulation by host of viral transcription; megakaryocyte development; intrinsic apoptotic signaling pathway in response to DNA damage by p53 class mediator; internal protein amino acid acetylation; regulation of cell cycle; regulation of tubulin deacetylation; positive regulation of gene expression; histone H4 acetylation; regulation of cellular response to heat; transcription-coupled nucleotide-excision repair; skeletal muscle tissue development; positive regulation of type I interferon production; response to estrogen; response to hypoxia; regulation of signal transduction by p53 class mediator; internal peptidyl-lysine acetylation; beta-catenin-TCF complex assembly; DNA damage response, signal transduction by p53 class mediator resulting in cell cycle arrest; macrophage derived foam cell differentiation; circadian rhythm; protein deubiquitination; positive regulation of transcription by RNA polymerase II; protein destabilization; regulation of megakaryocyte differentiation; histone acetylation; epigenetic maintenance of chromatin in transcription-competent conformation; peptidyl-lysine propionylation; peptidyl-lysine crotonylation; peptidyl-lysine butyrylation
Sources:Amigo / QuickGO
Orthologs
Databases	NCBI: entry; OMA: entry
Species	Human	Mouse
Entrez	2033	328572
Ensembl	ENSG00000100393	ENSMUSG00000055024
UniProt	Q09472	B2RWS6
RefSeq (mRNA)	NM_001429; NM_001362843	NM_177821
RefSeq (protein)	NP_001420; NP_001349772	NP_808489
Location (UCSC)	Chr 22: 41.09 – 41.18 Mb	Chr 15: 81.47 – 81.54 Mb
PubMed search
- Wikidata
View/Edit Human	View/Edit Mouse

Histone acetyltransferase p300 also known as p300 HAT or E1A-associated protein p300 (where E1A = adenovirus early region 1A) also known as EP300 or p300 is an enzyme that, in humans, is encoded by the EP300 gene. It functions as histone acetyltransferase that regulates transcription of genes via chromatin remodeling by allowing histone proteins to wrap DNA less tightly. This enzyme plays an essential role in regulating cell growth and division, prompting cells to mature and assume specialized functions (differentiate), and preventing the growth of cancerous tumors. The p300 protein appears to be critical for normal development before and after birth.

The EP300 gene is located on the long (q) arm of the human chromosome 22 at position 13.2. This gene encodes the adenovirus E1A-associated cellular p300 transcriptional co-activator protein.

EP300 is closely related to another gene, CREB binding protein, which is found on human chromosome 16.

== Function ==
p300 HAT functions as histone acetyltransferase that regulates transcription via chromatin remodeling, and is important in the processes of cell proliferation and differentiation. It mediates cAMP-gene regulation by binding specifically to phosphorylated CREB protein.

p300 HAT contains a bromodomain which is involved in IL6 signaling.

This gene has also been identified as a co-activator of HIF1A (hypoxia-inducible factor 1 alpha), and, thus, plays a role in the stimulation of hypoxia-induced genes such as VEGF.

== Mechanism ==
The p300 protein carries out its function of activating transcription by binding to transcription factors, and the transcription machinery. On the basis of this function, p300 is called a transcriptional coactivator. The p300 interaction with transcription factors is managed by one or more of p300 domains: the nuclear receptor interaction domain (RID), the KIX domain (CREB and MYB interaction domain), the cysteine/histidine regions (TAZ1/CH1 and TAZ2/CH3) and the interferon response binding domain (IBiD). The last four domains, KIX, TAZ1, TAZ2 and IBiD of p300, each bind tightly to a sequence spanning both transactivation domains 9aaTADs of transcription factor p53.

== Clinical significance ==
Mutations in the EP300 gene are responsible for a small percentage of cases of Rubinstein-Taybi syndrome. These mutations result in the loss of one copy of the gene in each cell, which reduces the amount of p300 protein by half. Some mutations lead to the production of a very short, nonfunctional version of the p300 protein, while others prevent one copy of the gene from making any protein at all. Although researchers do not know how a reduction in the amount of p300 protein leads to the specific features of Rubinstein-Taybi syndrome, it is clear that the loss of one copy of the EP300 gene disrupts normal development.

Chromosomal rearrangements involving chromosome 22 have rarely been associated with certain types of cancer. These rearrangements, called translocations, disrupt the region of chromosome 22 that contains the EP300 gene. For example, researchers have found a translocation between chromosomes 8 and 22 in several people with a cancer of blood cells called acute myeloid leukemia (AML). Another translocation, involving chromosomes 11 and 22, has been found in a small number of people who have undergone cancer treatment. This chromosomal change is associated with the development of AML following chemotherapy for other forms of cancer.

Mutations in the EP300 gene have been identified in several other types of cancer. These mutations are somatic, which means they are acquired during a person's lifetime and are present only in certain cells. Somatic mutations in the EP300 gene have been found in a small number of solid tumors, including cancers of the colon and rectum, stomach, breast, and pancreas. Studies suggest that EP300 mutations may also play a role in the development of some prostate cancers, and could help predict whether these tumors will increase in size or spread to other parts of the body. In cancer cells, EP300 mutations prevent the gene from producing any functional protein. Without p300, cells cannot effectively restrain growth and division, which can allow cancerous tumors to form.

== Interactions ==
EP300 has been shown to interact with:

- BCL3,
- BRCA1,
- CDX2,
- CEBPB,
- CITED1,
- CITED2,
- DDX5,
- DTX1,
- EID1,
- ELK1,
- ESR1,
- FEN1,
- GPS2,
- HIF1A,
- HNF1A,
- HNRPU,
- ING4,
- ING5,
- IRF2,
- LEF1,
- MAF,
- MAML1,
- MEF2C,
- MEF2D,
- MYBL2,
- Mdm2,
- MyoD,
- MEF2A,
- NCOA6,
- NFATC2,
- NPAS2,
- P53,
- PAX6,
- PCNA,
- POLI,
- PROX1,
- PTMA,
- PPARA,
- PPARG,
- RORA,
- RELA,
- SMAD1,
- SMAD2,
- SMAD7,
- SNIP1,
- SS18,
- STAT3,
- STAT6,
- TAL1,
- TCF3,
- TFAP2A,
- TGS1,
- TRERF1,
- TSG101,
- THRA,
- TWIST1,
- YY1, and
- Zif268.
