= PROX1 =

Protein-coding gene in humans

Identifiers
- Aliases: PROX1, prospero homeobox 1
- External IDs: OMIM: 601546; MGI: 97772; GeneCards: PROX1
Available structures
PDB	Ortholog search: PDBe RCSB
PDB	List of PDB id codes 2LMD

Gene location (Human)
Chr.	Chromosome 1 (human)
Band	1q32.3	Start	213,983,181 bp
Band	1q32.3	End	214,041,510 bp

Gene location (Mouse)
Chr.	Chromosome 1 (mouse)
Band	1 H6|1 95.85 cM	Start	189,850,232 bp
Band	1 H6|1 95.85 cM	End	189,902,911 bp
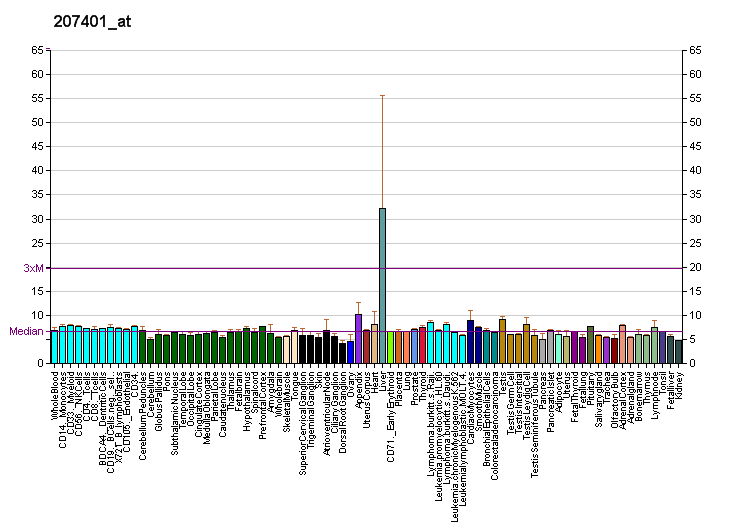
RNA expression pattern
Bgee	Human / Mouse (ortholog); Top expressed in: sural nerve; liver; right lobe of liver; right ventricle; buccal mucosa cell; corpus callosum; biceps brachii; islet of Langerhans; Skeletal muscle tissue of biceps brachii; body of pancreas / Top expressed in: lens; neural layer of retina; dentate gyrus of hippocampal formation granule cell; subthalamus; atrioventricular valve; nucleus reuniens; lumbar subsegment of spinal cord; Rostral migratory stream; white matter; aortic valve; More reference expression data
BioGPS	More reference expression data
Gene ontology
Molecular function	DNA binding; sequence-specific DNA binding; transcription corepressor activity; DNA binding domain binding; DNA-binding transcription factor activity; LBD domain binding; DNA-binding transcription repressor activity, RNA polymerase II-specific; core promoter sequence-specific DNA binding; protein binding; nuclear receptor binding; transcription factor activity, RNA polymerase II distal enhancer sequence-specific binding; DNA-binding transcription factor activity, RNA polymerase II-specific; RNA polymerase II cis-regulatory region sequence-specific DNA binding
Cellular component	cytoplasm; nucleus
Biological process	dorsal spinal cord development; olfactory placode formation; regulation of transcription, DNA-templated; positive regulation of endothelial cell proliferation; venous blood vessel morphogenesis; kidney development; lymphangiogenesis; lung development; dentate gyrus development; rhythmic process; ventricular septum morphogenesis; cardiac muscle cell differentiation; lymphatic endothelial cell differentiation; positive regulation of sarcomere organization; positive regulation of forebrain neuron differentiation; endocardium formation; hepatocyte differentiation; negative regulation of transcription by RNA polymerase II; negative regulation of DNA-binding transcription factor activity; lymph vessel development; hepatocyte cell migration; transcription, DNA-templated; lens placode formation involved in camera-type eye formation; skeletal muscle thin filament assembly; neuronal stem cell population maintenance; positive regulation of endothelial cell migration; positive regulation of transcription, DNA-templated; positive regulation of heart growth; ventricular cardiac muscle tissue morphogenesis; positive regulation of neural precursor cell proliferation; retina morphogenesis in camera-type eye; multicellular organism development; negative regulation of viral genome replication; brain development; branching involved in pancreas morphogenesis; positive regulation of cell cycle; lens development in camera-type eye; response to nutrient levels; hepatocyte proliferation; positive regulation of cell cycle checkpoint; regulation of circadian rhythm; circadian rhythm; acinar cell differentiation; neural tube development; neuron differentiation; positive regulation of cell population proliferation; lens morphogenesis in camera-type eye; positive regulation of cyclin-dependent protein serine/threonine kinase activity; negative regulation of bile acid biosynthetic process; embryonic retina morphogenesis in camera-type eye; regulation of gene expression; cell fate determination; pancreas development; liver development; atrial cardiac muscle tissue morphogenesis; endothelial cell differentiation; inner ear development; negative regulation of transcription, DNA-templated; ventricular cardiac myofibril assembly; otic placode formation; aorta smooth muscle tissue morphogenesis; cerebellar granule cell differentiation; negative regulation of cell population proliferation; positive regulation of transcription by RNA polymerase II; lens fiber cell morphogenesis
Sources:Amigo / QuickGO
Orthologs
Databases	NCBI: entry; OMA: entry
Species	Human	Mouse
Entrez	5629	19130
Ensembl	ENSG00000117707	ENSMUSG00000010175
UniProt	Q92786	P48437
RefSeq (mRNA)	NM_001270616; NM_002763	NM_008937; NM_001360827
RefSeq (protein)	NP_001257545; NP_002754	NP_032963; NP_001347756
Location (UCSC)	Chr 1: 213.98 – 214.04 Mb	Chr 1: 189.85 – 189.9 Mb
PubMed search
- Wikidata
View/Edit Human	View/Edit Mouse

Prospero homeobox protein 1 is a protein that in humans is encoded by the PROX1 gene. The Prox1 gene is critical for the development of multiple tissues. Prox1 activity is necessary and sufficient to specify a lymphatic endothelial cell fate in endothelial progenitors located in the embryonic veins.

== Interactions ==
PROX1 has been shown to interact with EP300.

== Production ==
PROX1 is produced primarily in the dentate gyrus in the mouse, and in the dentate gyrus and white matter in humans. Gene expression data for mouse, human and macaque from the Allen Brain Atlases can be found here.

== Clinical significance ==
PROX1 is used as a marker for lymphatic endothelium in biopsy samples. It has also been identified as an inhibitor of Müller glia (MG)-mediated retinal regeneration in mice that, when blocked from accessing MG cells, allowed retinal regeneration to occur, suggesting a possible therapeutic research pathway for drugs to treat degenerative diseases (such as retinitis pigmentosa) that lead to vision loss.

== Homologous gene ==
PROX2
