= Branchio-oculo-facial syndrome =

- Other names: Hemangiomatous branchial clefts-lip pseudocleft syndrome
- Autosomal dominant is the manner of inheritance of this condition
- Frequency: 0.0001%

Branchio-oculo-facial syndrome (BOFS) is a disease that arises from a mutation in the TFAP2A gene. It is a rare autosomal dominant disorder that starts to affect a child's development before birth. Symptoms of this condition include skin abnormalities on the neck, deformities of the ears and eyes, and other distinctive facial features such as a cleft lip along with slow growth, intellectual disability and premature graying of hair.

== Signs and symptoms ==
"Branchio" refers to the branchial arches, also known as the pharyngeal arches, of the affected individual. The branchial arches are structures in the developing embryo that give rise to certain tissues in the neck and facial area. In individuals affected by this condition, the branchial arches fail to develop properly. This leads to some of the physical conditions of this syndrome, which include abnormal patches of skin on the neck and face region and can be abnormally hairy, thin or red and with a high number of blood vessels. "Oculo" refers to the eyes. Individuals have vision impairment due to several malformations in the eyes such as small eyeballs, blockage in the tear ducts or lacking eyes completely. "Facial" refers to the face; those affected can have several abnormalities in that region. These abnormalities include a cleft lip, a cleft palate which is an opening in the roof of the mouth, widely spaced eyes (hypertelorism), sharp corners of the mouth that point upward, a broad nose that can include a flattened tip, along with several deformations of both the external and middle ear structures. This syndrome is restricted to the face, but it can also cause underdeveloped or malformed kidneys.

== Pathophysiology ==
The disease is genetically inherited and stems from a mutation that deletes the TFAP2A gene. This gene is important because it provides the blueprint for the arrangement of 437 amino acids that make up the protein transcription factor known as AP-2 alpha. This protein transcription factor binds to a carboxy-terminus helix-span-helix motif and an amino-terminus portion of DNA that affects the activity of numerous cellular activities such as cell division and apoptosis. AP-2 alpha is especially important during the embryo's development principally in the development of the branchial arches. Currently, there are also four other proteins are affected by the deletion of the TFAP2A gene as well. One is L249P, this protein changes to causes a conformational space change with a substituted proline. Furthermore, a change in the R254W and R255G proteins results in a replacement of a charged polar side chain by a nonpolar side chain, and lastly, an alteration in the G262E protein results in a nonpolar side chain being replaced by a charged polar side chain.

== Diagnosis ==
Branchio-oculo-facial syndrome is difficult to diagnose because it has incomplete penetrance. It is often misdiagnosed as branchio-oto-renal syndrome because of its similarities in symptoms.

== Management ==
The care and management of people with BOFS is aimed at the specific signs and symptoms, and should be carried out by a multi-specialty team who are skilled in craniofacial disorders. A medical geneticist usually makes the clinical diagnosis, which is confirmed with molecular testing. Reconstructive surgery is needed to repair facial deformities and obstructed nasal ducts. Importantly, the skin defects should not be treated with simple cauterization. Strabismus ("crossed eyes") may be corrected by surgery.

In addition, people with BOFS should be managed by an ophthalmologist, otolaryngologist, dentist, and speech therapist. Depending on the person's issues, there may be a need for a neuropsychological or developmental evaluation and mental health support.

Genetic counseling is recommended for patients and their families for reproductive health.

== Epidemiology ==
It was estimated that only 100 cases of BOFS have been documented in the medical literature as of 2018.
