= TFAP2A =

Protein-coding gene in the species Homo sapiens

Identifiers
- Aliases: TFAP2A, AP-2, AP-2alpha, AP2TF, BOFS, TFAP2, transcription factor AP-2 alpha
- External IDs: OMIM: 107580; MGI: 104671; GeneCards: TFAP2A

Gene location (Human)
Chr.	Chromosome 6 (human)
Band	6p24.3	Start	10,393,186 bp
Band	6p24.3	End	10,419,659 bp

Gene location (Mouse)
Chr.	Chromosome 13 (mouse)
Band	13 A3.3|13 20.01 cM	Start	40,868,778 bp
Band	13 A3.3|13 20.01 cM	End	40,891,852 bp
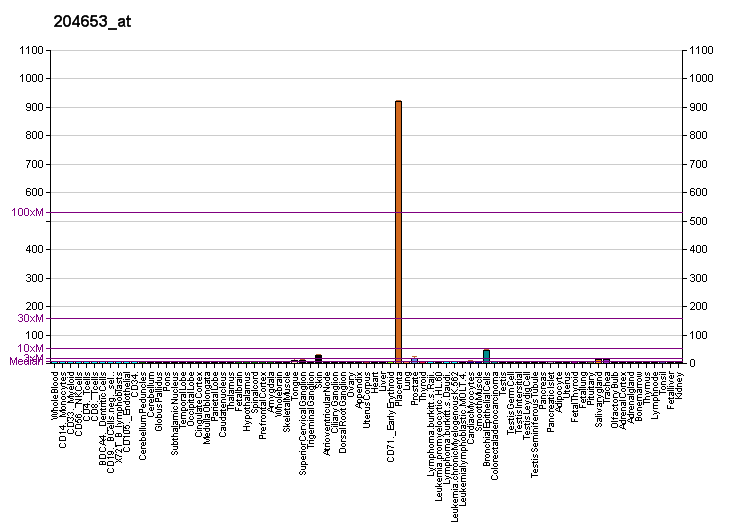

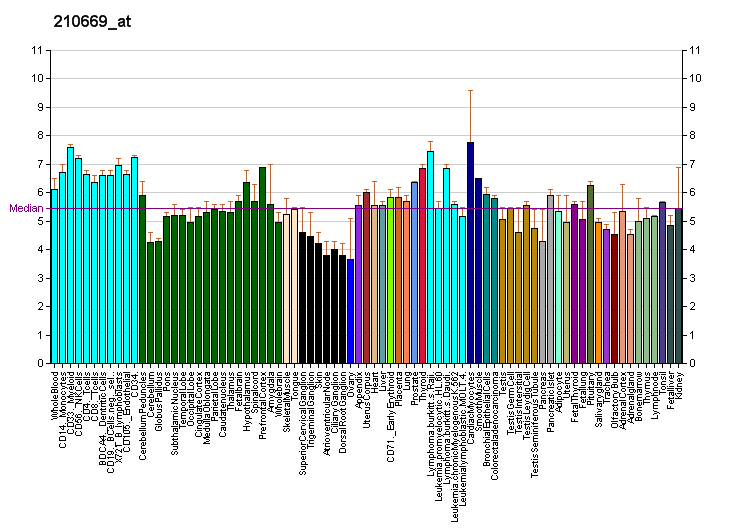

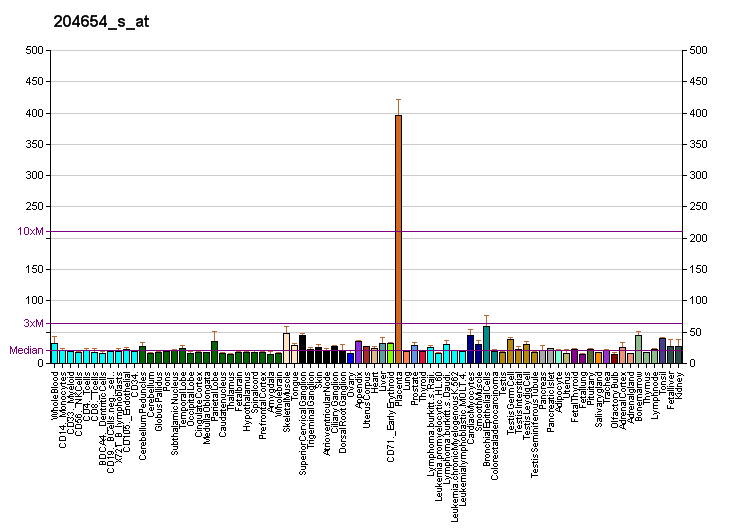
RNA expression pattern
Bgee	Human / Mouse (ortholog); Top expressed in: skin of thigh; gingival epithelium; skin of arm; vulva; skin of hip; skin of abdomen; hair follicle; epithelium of lactiferous gland; lactiferous duct; nipple / Top expressed in: hair follicle; epithelium of lens; conjunctival fornix; lip; cornea; lobe of prostate; skin of abdomen; parotid gland; skin of external ear; maxillary prominence; More reference expression data
BioGPS	More reference expression data
Gene ontology
Molecular function	DNA binding; protein dimerization activity; protein homodimerization activity; DNA-binding transcription factor activity; transcription coactivator activity; DNA-binding transcription activator activity, RNA polymerase II-specific; chromatin binding; cis-regulatory region sequence-specific DNA binding; transcription cis-regulatory region binding; RNA polymerase II cis-regulatory region sequence-specific DNA binding; transcription factor activity, RNA polymerase II core promoter proximal region sequence-specific binding; DNA-binding transcription repressor activity, RNA polymerase II-specific; protein binding; RNA polymerase II core promoter sequence-specific DNA binding; sequence-specific DNA binding; DNA-binding transcription factor activity, RNA polymerase II-specific; RNA polymerase II transcription regulatory region sequence-specific DNA binding
Cellular component	centrosome; Golgi apparatus; intracellular membrane-bounded organelle; nucleus; nucleoplasm; cytosol
Biological process	roof of mouth development; cellular response to iron ion; regulation of transcription, DNA-templated; retina layer formation; kidney development; positive regulation of bone mineralization; trigeminal nerve development; negative regulation of transcription by competitive promoter binding; optic vesicle morphogenesis; bone morphogenesis; negative regulation of apoptotic process; hearing; eyelid development in camera-type eye; transcription, DNA-templated; positive regulation of transcription, DNA-templated; positive regulation of neuron apoptotic process; positive regulation of gene expression; inner ear morphogenesis; optic cup structural organization; regulation of cell differentiation; embryonic cranial skeleton morphogenesis; negative regulation of reactive oxygen species metabolic process; negative regulation of transcription, DNA-templated; embryonic forelimb morphogenesis; oculomotor nerve formation; negative regulation of cell population proliferation; positive regulation of tooth mineralization; transcription by RNA polymerase II; negative regulation of transcription by RNA polymerase II; regulation of transcription by RNA polymerase II; positive regulation of transcription by RNA polymerase II; positive regulation of nucleic acid-templated transcription
Sources:Amigo / QuickGO
Orthologs
Databases	NCBI: entry; OMA: entry
Species	Human	Mouse
Entrez	7020	21418
Ensembl	ENSG00000137203	ENSMUSG00000021359
UniProt	P05549	P34056
RefSeq (mRNA)	NM_001032280; NM_001042425; NM_003220; NM_001372066	NM_001122948; NM_001301674; NM_011547
RefSeq (protein)	NP_001027451; NP_001035890; NP_003211; NP_001358995	NP_001116420; NP_001288603; NP_035677
Location (UCSC)	Chr 6: 10.39 – 10.42 Mb	Chr 13: 40.87 – 40.89 Mb
PubMed search
- Wikidata
View/Edit Human	View/Edit Mouse

Transcription factor AP-2 alpha (Activating enhancer binding Protein 2 alpha), also known as TFAP2A, is a protein that in humans is encoded by the TFAP2A gene.

== Function ==
Transcription factor AP-2 alpha is a 52-kD sequence-specific DNA-binding protein that enhances transcription of specific genes by binding to a GC-rich DNA sequence first identified in the cis-regulatory region of SV40 virus DNA and in cis-regulatory regions of a variety of cellular genes.

The TFAP2-alpha gene was isolated and found to be retinoic acid-inducible in NT2 teratocarcinoma cells suggesting a potential role for AP-2 alpha in cellular differentiation.

During embryonic development, AP-2 alpha is expressed in neural crest cells migrating from the cranial neural folds during neural tube closure, and is also expressed in ectoderm, parts of the central nervous system, limb buds, and mesonephric system suggesting that AP-2 alpha plays an important role in the determination and development of these tissues. Cranial neural crest cells populate the developing face and provide patterning information for craniofacial morphogenesis and generate most of the skull bones and the cranial ganglia.

AP-2 alpha knockout mice die perinatally with cranio-abdominoschisis and severe dysmorphogenesis of the face, skull, sensory organs, and cranial ganglia. Homozygous knockout mice also have neural tube defects followed by craniofacial and body wall abnormalities. In vivo gene delivery of AP-2 alpha suppressed spontaneous intestinal polyps in the Apc(Min/+) mouse. AP-2 alpha also functions as a master regulator of multiple transcription factors in the mouse liver.

In melanocytic cells TFAP2A gene expression may be regulated by MITF.

== Clinical significance ==
Mutations in the TFAP2A gene cause Branchio-oculo-facial syndrome often with a midline cleft lip. In a family with branchio-oculo-facial syndrome (BOFS), a 3.2-Mb deletion at chromosome 6p24.3 was detected. Sequencing of candidate genes in that region in 4 additional unrelated BOFS patients revealed 4 different de novo missense mutations in the exons 4 and 5 of the TFAP2A gene.

A disruption of an AP-2 alpha binding site in an IRF6 enhancer is associated with cleft lip. Mutations in IRF6 gene cause Van der Woude syndrome (VWS) that is a rare mendelian clefting autossomal dominant disorder with lower lip pits in 85% of affected individuals. The remaining 15% of individuals with Van der Woude syndrome show only cleft lip and/or cleft palate (CL/P) and are clinically indistinguishable from the common non syndromic CL/P. NSCL/P occur in approximately 1/700 live births and is one of the most common form of congenital abnormalities. A previous association study between SNPs in and around IRF6 and NSCL/P have shown significant results in different populations and was independently replicated.

A search of NSCL/P cases for potential regulatory elements for IRF6 gene was made aligning genomic sequences to a 500 Kb region encompassing IRF6 from 17 vertebrate species. Human sequence as reference and searched for multispecies conserved sequences (MCSs). Regions contained in introns 5’ and 3’ flanking IRF6 were screened by direct sequencing for potential causative variants in 184 NSCL/P cases. The rare allele of the SNP rs642961 showed a significant association with cleft lip cases. Analysis of transcription factor binding site analysis showed that the risk allele disrupt a binding site for AP-2 alpha.

Mutations in the AP-2 alpha gene also cause branchio-oculo-facial syndrome, which has overlapping features with Van der Woude syndrome such as orofacial clefting and occasional lip pits what make rs642961 a good candidate for an etiological variant. These findings show that IRF6 and AP-2 alpha are in the same developmental pathway and identify a variant in a regulatory region that contributes substantially to a common complex disorder.

== Interactions ==
TFAP2A has been shown to interact with:

- APC
- CITED2
- DEK
- EP300
- Myc and
- P53.

== See also ==
- Activating protein 2
- Branchio-oculo-facial syndrome
