= CITED2 =

Protein-coding gene in humans

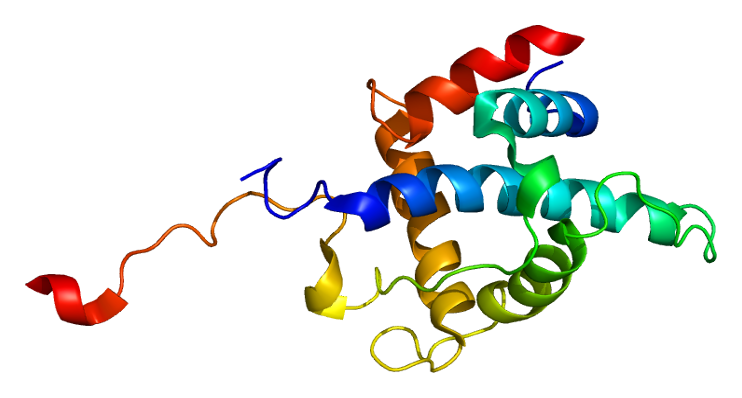
Available structures
PDB	Ortholog search: PDBe RCSB
PDB	List of PDB id codes 1P4Q, 1R8U

Identifiers
- Aliases: CITED2, ASD8, MRG-1, MRG1, P35SRJ, VSD2, Cbp/p300 interacting transactivator with Glu/Asp rich carboxy-terminal domain 2
- External IDs: OMIM: 602937; MGI: 1306784; HomoloGene: 4433; GeneCards: CITED2; OMA:CITED2 - orthologs

Gene location (Human)
Chr.	Chromosome 6 (human)
Band	6q24.1	Start	139,371,807 bp
Band	6q24.1	End	139,374,648 bp

Gene location (Mouse)
Chr.	Chromosome 10 (mouse)
Band	10|10 A2	Start	17,598,966 bp
Band	10|10 A2	End	17,601,422 bp
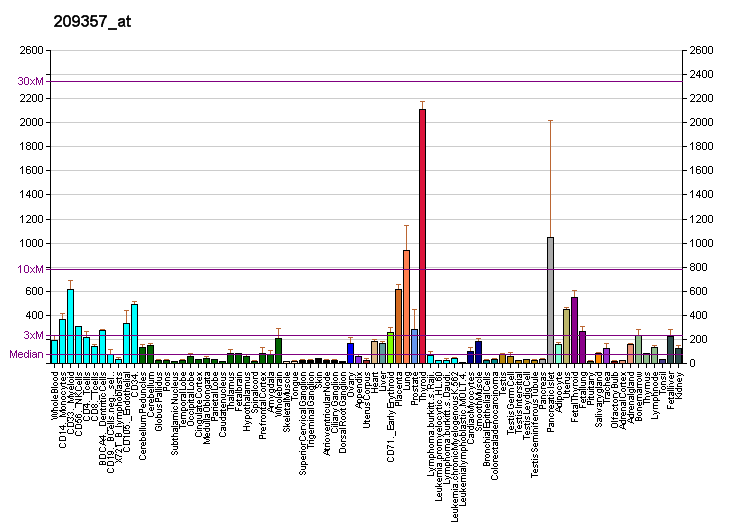

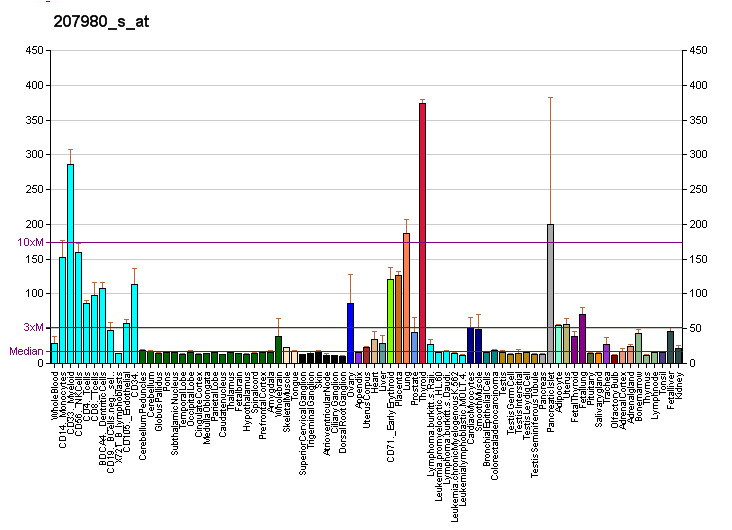
RNA expression pattern
Bgee	Human / Mouse (ortholog); Top expressed in: stromal cell of endometrium; beta cell; gastric mucosa; left ovary; right ovary; nipple; decidua; left uterine tube; right lung; Skeletal muscle tissue of rectus abdominis / Top expressed in: medullary collecting duct; renal corpuscle; left lung lobe; primitive streak; lobe of cerebellum; habenula; decidua; cerebellar vermis; vestibular membrane of cochlear duct; retina; More reference expression data
BioGPS	More reference expression data
Gene ontology
Molecular function	transcription coactivator activity; transcription corepressor activity; DNA-binding transcription factor activity; chromatin binding; LBD domain binding; protein binding; histone acetyltransferase binding; protein domain specific binding
Cellular component	cytoplasm; nucleus; nucleoplasm; protein-containing complex
Biological process	nodal signaling pathway involved in determination of lateral mesoderm left/right asymmetry; adrenal cortex formation; positive regulation of transforming growth factor beta receptor signaling pathway; cell differentiation; response to hypoxia; regulation of transcription, DNA-templated; positive regulation of cell-cell adhesion; embryonic heart tube left/right pattern formation; ventricular septum morphogenesis; outflow tract morphogenesis; negative regulation of apoptotic process; negative regulation of transcription by RNA polymerase II; spleen development; negative regulation of gene expression; transcription, DNA-templated; response to fluid shear stress; response to estrogen; positive regulation of transcription, DNA-templated; multicellular organism development; heart development; determination of left/right symmetry; positive regulation of gene expression; negative regulation of cell migration; positive regulation of cell cycle; regulation of animal organ formation; sex-determination system; positive regulation of peroxisome proliferator activated receptor signaling pathway; liver development; left/right pattern formation; negative regulation of transcription from RNA polymerase II promoter in response to hypoxia; cell population proliferation; negative regulation of transcription, DNA-templated; left/right axis specification; positive regulation of male gonad development; positive regulation of transcription by RNA polymerase II; transcription by RNA polymerase II; positive regulation of nucleic acid-templated transcription; regulation of transcription by RNA polymerase II
Sources:Amigo / QuickGO
Orthologs
Species	Human	Mouse
Entrez	10370	17684
Ensembl	ENSG00000164442	ENSMUSG00000039910
UniProt	Q99967	O35740
RefSeq (mRNA)	NM_006079; NM_001168388; NM_001168389	NM_010828
RefSeq (protein)	NP_001161860; NP_001161861; NP_006070	NP_034958
Location (UCSC)	Chr 6: 139.37 – 139.37 Mb	Chr 10: 17.6 – 17.6 Mb
PubMed search
- Wikidata
View/Edit Human	View/Edit Mouse

Cbp/p300-interacting transactivator 2 is a protein that in humans is encoded by the CITED2 gene.

== Interactions ==
CITED2 has been shown to interact with EP300, LHX2, TFAP2A, and WT1.
