= SNIP1 =

Protein-coding gene in humans

Identifiers
- Aliases: SNIP1, PMRED, Smad nuclear interacting protein 1, PML1, NEDHCS
- External IDs: OMIM: 608241; MGI: 2156003; GeneCards: SNIP1

Gene location (Human)
Chr.	Chromosome 1 (human)
Band	1p34.3	Start	37,534,449 bp
Band	1p34.3	End	37,554,293 bp

Gene location (Mouse)
Chr.	Chromosome 4 (mouse)
Band	4|4 D2.2	Start	124,960,465 bp
Band	4|4 D2.2	End	124,967,835 bp
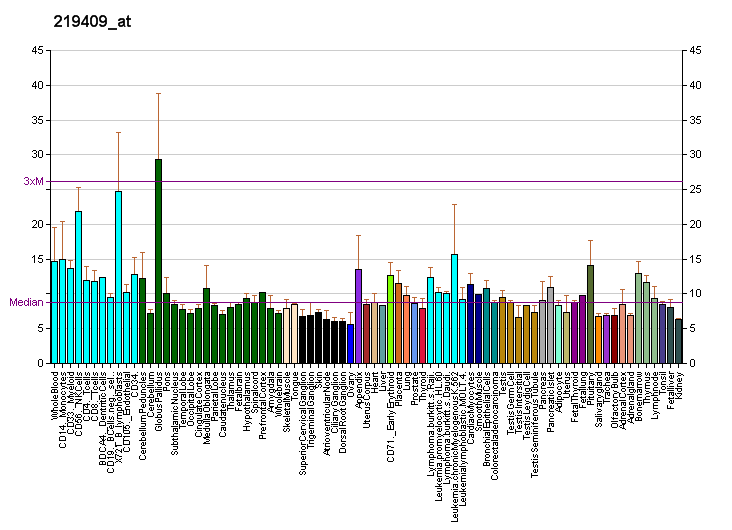
RNA expression pattern
Bgee	Human / Mouse (ortholog); Top expressed in: secondary oocyte; sural nerve; gonad; buccal mucosa cell; Achilles tendon; testicle; islet of Langerhans; bone marrow cell; stromal cell of endometrium; white blood cell / Top expressed in: spermatocyte; spermatid; primitive streak; granulocyte; epiblast; endocardial cushion; seminiferous tubule; medullary collecting duct; medial ganglionic eminence; renal corpuscle; More reference expression data
BioGPS	More reference expression data
Gene ontology
Molecular function	protein binding; mRNA binding; RNA binding
Cellular component	nucleoplasm; nucleus; cytosol; U2-type precatalytic spliceosome
Biological process	positive regulation of protein targeting to mitochondrion; I-kappaB kinase/NF-kappaB signaling; gene silencing; regulation of transcription, DNA-templated; production of miRNAs involved in gene silencing by miRNA; mRNA splicing, via spliceosome
Sources:Amigo / QuickGO
Orthologs
Databases	NCBI: entry; OMA: entry
Species	Human	Mouse
Entrez	79753	76793
Ensembl	ENSG00000163877	ENSMUSG00000050213
UniProt	Q8TAD8	Q8BIZ6
RefSeq (mRNA)	NM_024700	NM_175246; NM_001356560
RefSeq (protein)	NP_078976	NP_780455; NP_001343489
Location (UCSC)	Chr 1: 37.53 – 37.55 Mb	Chr 4: 124.96 – 124.97 Mb
PubMed search
- Wikidata
View/Edit Human	View/Edit Mouse

Smad nuclear-interacting protein 1 is a protein that in humans is encoded by the SNIP1 gene.

== Interactions ==
SNIP1 has been shown to interact with EP300.
