= ING5 =

Protein-coding gene in the species Homo sapiens

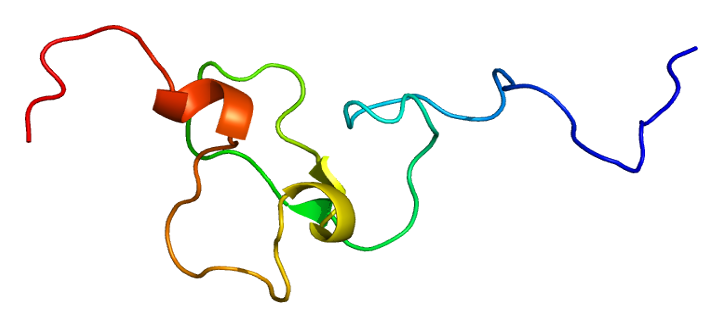

Identifiers
- Aliases: ING5, p28inhibitor of growth family member 5
- External IDs: OMIM: 608525; MGI: 1922816; GeneCards: ING5
Available structures
PDB	Ortholog search: PDBe RCSB
PDB	List of PDB id codes 3C6W

Gene location (Human)
Chr.	Chromosome 2 (human)
Band	2q37.3	Start	241,687,085 bp
Band	2q37.3	End	241,729,478 bp

Gene location (Mouse)
Chr.	Chromosome 1 (mouse)
Band	1|1 D	Start	93,731,687 bp
Band	1|1 D	End	93,749,823 bp
RNA expression pattern
Bgee	Human / Mouse (ortholog); Top expressed in: sural nerve; right uterine tube; left ovary; right hemisphere of cerebellum; body of pancreas; right lobe of thyroid gland; left lobe of thyroid gland; right ovary; pituitary gland; anterior pituitary / Top expressed in: primitive streak; medullary collecting duct; otic vesicle; otolith organ; hand; utricle; cumulus cell; retinal pigment epithelium; ciliary body; epiblast; More reference expression data
BioGPS	n/a
Gene ontology
Molecular function	methylated histone binding; protein binding; metal ion binding; chromatin binding
Cellular component	MOZ/MORF histone acetyltransferase complex; nucleus; nucleoplasm
Biological process	positive regulation of transcription, DNA-templated; DNA replication; negative regulation of growth; regulation of transcription, DNA-templated; histone acetylation; histone H3 acetylation; transcription, DNA-templated; protein acetylation; negative regulation of cell population proliferation; positive regulation of apoptotic process; regulation of signal transduction by p53 class mediator; chromatin organization; positive regulation of apoptotic signaling pathway
Sources:Amigo / QuickGO
Orthologs
Databases	NCBI: entry; OMA: entry
Species	Human	Mouse
Entrez	84289	66262
Ensembl	ENSG00000168395	ENSMUSG00000026283
UniProt	Q8WYH8	Q9D8Y8
RefSeq (mRNA)	NM_032329; NM_001330161; NM_001330162	NM_025454; NM_029340
RefSeq (protein)	NP_001317090; NP_001317091; NP_115705	NP_079730
Location (UCSC)	Chr 2: 241.69 – 241.73 Mb	Chr 1: 93.73 – 93.75 Mb
PubMed search
- Wikidata
View/Edit Human	View/Edit Mouse

Inhibitor of growth protein 5 is a protein that in humans is encoded by the ING5 gene.

The protein encoded by this gene is similar to ING1, a tumor suppressor protein that can interact with TP53, inhibit cell growth, and induce apoptosis. This protein contains a PHD-finger, which is a common motif in proteins involved in chromatin remodeling. This protein can bind TP53 and EP300/p300, a component of the histone acetyl transferase complex, suggesting its involvement in TP53-dependent regulatory pathway.

== Interactions ==
ING5 has been shown to interact with EP300 and P53.
