= MAP3K7CL =

Protein-coding gene in the species Homo sapiens

Identifiers
- Aliases: MAP3K7CL, C21orf7, HC21ORF7, TAK1L, TAKL, TAKL-1, TAKL-2, TAKL-4, MAP3K7 C-terminal like
- External IDs: OMIM: 611110; MGI: 2446584; HomoloGene: 137339; GeneCards: MAP3K7CL; OMA:MAP3K7CL - orthologs

Gene location (Human)
Chr.	Chromosome 21 (human)
Band	21q21.3	Start	29,077,471 bp
Band	21q21.3	End	29,175,889 bp

Gene location (Mouse)
Chr.	Chromosome 16 (mouse)
Band	16|16 C3.3	Start	87,350,218 bp
Band	16|16 C3.3	End	87,392,224 bp
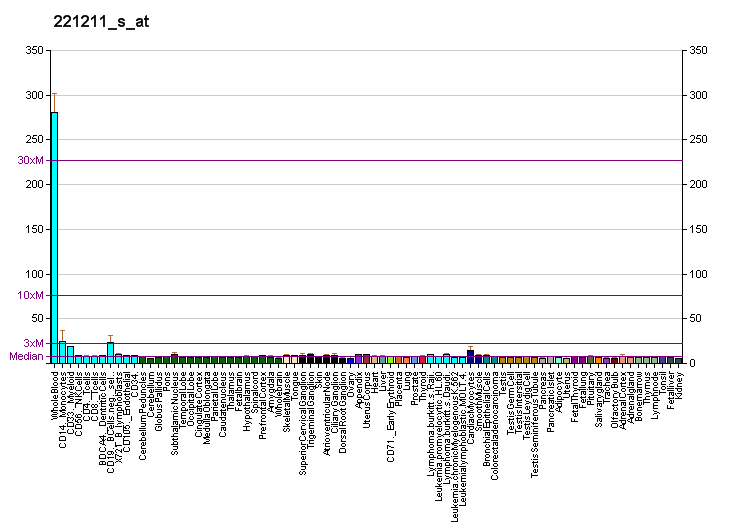
RNA expression pattern
Bgee	Human / Mouse (ortholog); Top expressed in: monocyte; oocyte; right coronary artery; saphenous vein; granulocyte; secondary oocyte; muscle of thigh; tibial arteries; ascending aorta; gastrocnemius muscle / Top expressed in: zygote; muscle of thigh; ascending aorta; lip; lumbar subsegment of spinal cord; right kidney; aortic valve; esophagus; proximal tubule; skeletal muscle tissue; More reference expression data
BioGPS	More reference expression data
Gene ontology
Molecular function	protein binding; MAP kinase kinase kinase activity
Cellular component	cytosol; nucleus
Biological process	MAPK cascade
Sources:Amigo / QuickGO
Orthologs
Species	Human	Mouse
Entrez	56911	224419
Ensembl	ENSG00000156265	ENSMUSG00000025610
UniProt	P57077	P58500
RefSeq (mRNA)	NM_020152; NM_001286617; NM_001286618; NM_001286619; NM_001286620 NM_001286622; NM_001286623; NM_001286624; NM_001286634	NM_144854
RefSeq (protein)	NP_001273546; NP_001273547; NP_001273548; NP_001273549; NP_001273551 NP_001273552; NP_001273553; NP_001273563; NP_064537; NP_001358298; NP_001358299; NP_001358300; NP_001358301; NP_001358302; NP_001358303; NP_001358305	NP_659103
Location (UCSC)	Chr 21: 29.08 – 29.18 Mb	Chr 16: 87.35 – 87.39 Mb
PubMed search
- Wikidata
View/Edit Human	View/Edit Mouse

MAP3K7CL, is a human gene located on chromosome 21. It is a protein-coding gene.

== Interactions ==
MAP3K7CL has been shown to interact with GPS2.
