= MYBL2 =

Protein-coding gene in the species Homo sapiens

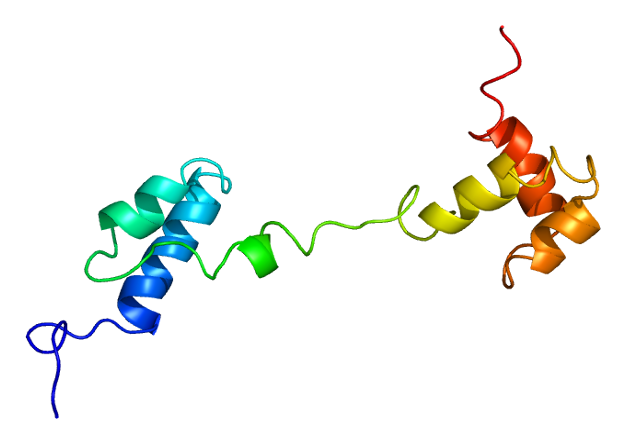

Identifiers
- Aliases: MYBL2, B-MYB, BMYB, MYB proto-oncogene like 2
- External IDs: OMIM: 601415; MGI: 101785; GeneCards: MYBL2
Available structures
PDB	Ortholog search: PDBe RCSB
PDB	List of PDB id codes 2D9A

Gene location (Human)
Chr.	Chromosome 20 (human)
Band	20q13.12	Start	43,667,019 bp
Band	20q13.12	End	43,716,495 bp

Gene location (Mouse)
Chr.	Chromosome 2 (mouse)
Band	2 H2|2 84.0 cM	Start	162,896,607 bp
Band	2 H2|2 84.0 cM	End	162,926,608 bp
RNA expression pattern
Bgee	Human / Mouse (ortholog); Top expressed in: gonad; ganglionic eminence; ventricular zone; beta cell; bone marrow; bone marrow cell; appendix; mucosa of transverse colon; lymph node; trabecular bone / Top expressed in: zygote; yolk sac; secondary oocyte; blastocyst; primary oocyte; morula; epiblast; female urethra; tail of embryo; embryo; More reference expression data
BioGPS	n/a
Gene ontology
Molecular function	RNA polymerase II cis-regulatory region sequence-specific DNA binding; DNA binding; DNA-binding transcription activator activity, RNA polymerase II-specific; protein binding; DNA-binding transcription factor activity; DNA-binding transcription factor activity, RNA polymerase II-specific
Cellular component	Myb complex; nucleoplasm; nucleus
Biological process	regulation of cell cycle; regulation of transcription, DNA-templated; transcription, DNA-templated; positive regulation of transcription by RNA polymerase II; transcription by RNA polymerase II; cell differentiation; mitotic spindle assembly; regulation of transcription by RNA polymerase II; positive regulation of neuron apoptotic process; cellular response to leukemia inhibitory factor; mitotic cell cycle; positive regulation of transcription, DNA-templated
Sources:Amigo / QuickGO
Orthologs
Databases	NCBI: entry; OMA: entry
Species	Human	Mouse
Entrez	4605	17865
Ensembl	ENSG00000101057	ENSMUSG00000017861
UniProt	P10244	P48972
RefSeq (mRNA)	NM_002466; NM_001278610	NM_008652
RefSeq (protein)	NP_001265539; NP_002457	NP_032678
Location (UCSC)	Chr 20: 43.67 – 43.72 Mb	Chr 2: 162.9 – 162.93 Mb
PubMed search
- Wikidata
View/Edit Human	View/Edit Mouse

Myb-related protein B is a protein that in humans is encoded by the MYBL2 gene.

== Function ==
The protein encoded by this gene, a member of the MYB family of transcription factor genes, is a nuclear protein involved in cell cycle progression. The encoded protein is phosphorylated by cyclin A/cyclin-dependent kinase 2 during the S-phase of the cell cycle and possesses both activator and repressor activities. It has been shown to activate the cell division cycle 2, cyclin D1, and insulin-like growth factor-binding protein 5 genes. Transcript variants may exist for this gene, but their full-length natures have not been determined. MYBL2 is deregulated in various cancer types and can contribute to cancer progression.

== Interactions ==
MYBL2 has been shown to interact with:

- CDK9
- CREB-binding protein
- Cyclin A1
- Cyclin-dependent kinase inhibitor 1C
- EP300
- PARP1
- Retinoblastoma-like protein 1
