= ING4 =

Protein-coding gene in the species Homo sapiens

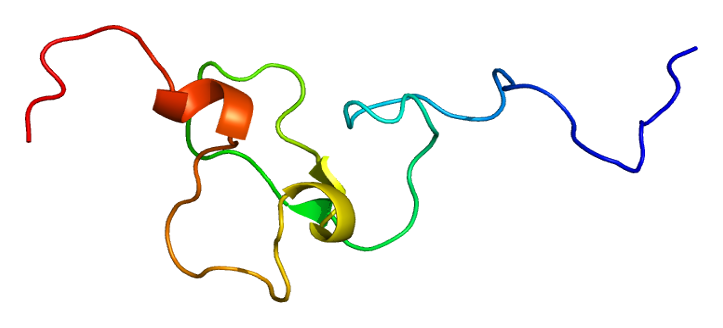

Identifiers
- Aliases: ING4, my036, p29inhibitor of growth family member 4
- External IDs: OMIM: 608524; MGI: 107307; GeneCards: ING4
Available structures
PDB	Ortholog search: PDBe RCSB
PDB	List of PDB id codes 2K1J, 2M1R, 2PNX, 2VNF, 4AFL

Gene location (Human)
Chr.	Chromosome 12 (human)
Band	12p13.31	Start	6,650,301 bp
Band	12p13.31	End	6,663,142 bp

Gene location (Mouse)
Chr.	Chromosome 6 (mouse)
Band	6 F2|6 59.17 cM	Start	125,016,723 bp
Band	6 F2|6 59.17 cM	End	125,026,228 bp
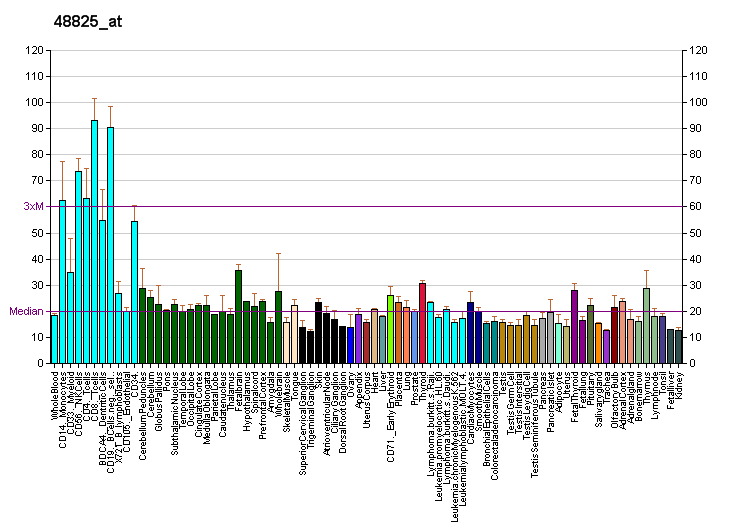

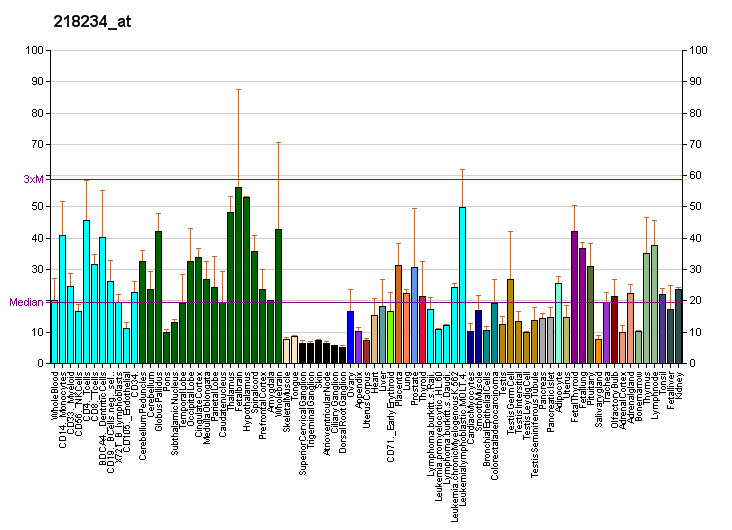
RNA expression pattern
Bgee	Human / Mouse (ortholog); Top expressed in: ganglionic eminence; monocyte; ventricular zone; right hemisphere of cerebellum; right uterine tube; granulocyte; right lobe of thyroid gland; left lobe of thyroid gland; C1 segment; muscle layer of sigmoid colon / Top expressed in: granulocyte; ventricular zone; lip; neural layer of retina; thin ascending limb of loop of Henle; right kidney; spermatocyte; muscle of thigh; morula; dentate gyrus of hippocampal formation granule cell; More reference expression data
BioGPS	More reference expression data
Gene ontology
Molecular function	transcription coactivator activity; metal ion binding; methylated histone binding; protein binding
Cellular component	histone acetyltransferase complex; nucleus; nucleoplasm; cytosol; intermediate filament cytoskeleton
Biological process	negative regulation of growth; histone H4-K5 acetylation; DNA replication; histone acetylation; histone H3 acetylation; positive regulation of apoptotic process; histone H4-K16 acetylation; cell cycle; negative regulation of transcription, DNA-templated; histone H4-K8 acetylation; histone H4-K12 acetylation; negative regulation of cell population proliferation; protein acetylation; DNA damage response, signal transduction by p53 class mediator resulting in transcription of p21 class mediator; apoptotic process; chromatin organization; positive regulation of nucleic acid-templated transcription
Sources:Amigo / QuickGO
Orthologs
Databases	NCBI: entry; OMA: entry
Species	Human	Mouse
Entrez	51147	28019
Ensembl	ENSG00000111653	ENSMUSG00000030330
UniProt	Q9UNL4	Q8C0D7
RefSeq (mRNA)	NM_001127582; NM_001127583; NM_001127584; NM_001127585; NM_001127586 NM_016162; NM_198287	NM_133345; NM_144510; NM_001368695
RefSeq (protein)	NP_001121054; NP_001121055; NP_001121056; NP_001121057; NP_001121058 NP_057246	NP_579923; NP_001355624
Location (UCSC)	Chr 12: 6.65 – 6.66 Mb	Chr 6: 125.02 – 125.03 Mb
PubMed search
- Wikidata
View/Edit Human	View/Edit Mouse

Inhibitor of growth protein 4 is a protein that in humans is encoded by the ING4 gene.

== Function ==
The protein encoded by this gene is similar to ING1, a tumor suppressor protein that can interact with TP53, inhibit cell growth, and induce apoptosis. This protein contains a PHD-finger, which is a common motif in proteins involved in chromatin remodeling. This protein can bind TP53 and EP300/p300, a component of the histone acetyl transferase complex, suggesting its involvement in the TP53-dependent regulatory pathway. Alternatively spliced transcript variants have been observed, but the biological validity of them has not been determined.

== Interactions ==
ING4 has been shown to interact with EP300, RELA and P53.
