= DEK (gene) =

Protein-coding gene in the species Homo sapiens

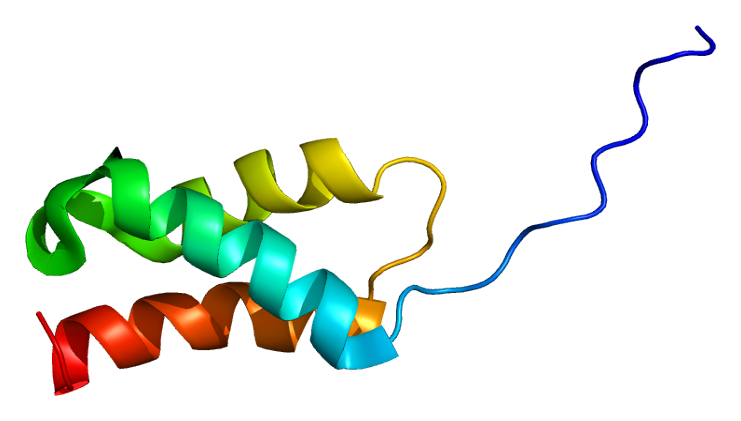

Identifiers
- Aliases: DEK, D6S231E, DEK proto-oncogene
- External IDs: OMIM: 125264; MGI: 1926209; GeneCards: DEK
Available structures
PDB	Ortholog search: PDBe RCSB
PDB	List of PDB id codes 1Q1V, 2JX3

Gene location (Human)
Chr.	Chromosome 6 (human)
Band	6p22.3	Start	18,223,860 bp
Band	6p22.3	End	18,264,548 bp

Gene location (Mouse)
Chr.	Chromosome 13 (mouse)
Band	13 A5|13 24.5 cM	Start	47,238,251 bp
Band	13 A5|13 24.5 cM	End	47,259,677 bp
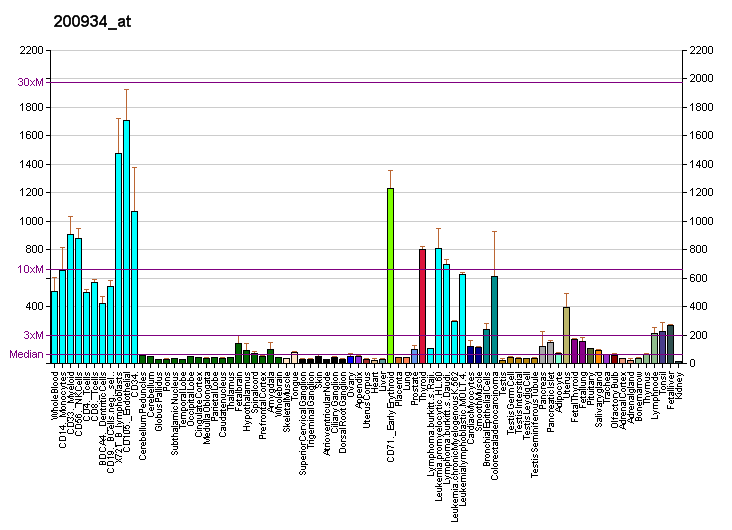
RNA expression pattern
Bgee	Human / Mouse (ortholog); Top expressed in: Achilles tendon; epithelium of nasopharynx; ventricular zone; tibia; ganglionic eminence; trabecular bone; amniotic fluid; germinal epithelium; skin of hip; jejunal mucosa / Top expressed in: tail of embryo; zygote; genital tubercle; secondary oocyte; primary oocyte; epiblast; bone marrow; ventricular zone; thymus; yolk sac; More reference expression data
BioGPS	More reference expression data
Gene ontology
Molecular function	DNA binding; histone binding; chromatin binding; RNA binding
Cellular component	nucleoplasm; contractile fiber; nucleus
Biological process	epigenetic maintenance of chromatin in transcription-competent conformation; viral genome replication; regulation of double-strand break repair via nonhomologous end joining; transcription by RNA polymerase II; regulation of transcription by RNA polymerase II; regulation of double-strand break repair; signal transduction; chromatin remodeling; chromatin organization
Sources:Amigo / QuickGO
Orthologs
Databases	NCBI: entry; OMA: entry
Species	Human	Mouse
Entrez	7913	110052
Ensembl	ENSG00000124795	ENSMUSG00000021377
UniProt	P35659	Q7TNV0
RefSeq (mRNA)	NM_001134709; NM_003472	NM_025900
RefSeq (protein)	NP_001128181; NP_003463	NP_080176
Location (UCSC)	Chr 6: 18.22 – 18.26 Mb	Chr 13: 47.24 – 47.26 Mb
PubMed search
- Wikidata
View/Edit Human	View/Edit Mouse

The human DEK gene encodes the DEK protein.

== Function ==
This gene encodes a protein with one SAP domain. The protein binds to cruciform DNA and DNA coiled into a superhelix, thereby inducing positive supercoils into closed circular DNA. It is also involved in splice site selection during mRNA processing. Chromosomal aberrations involving this region increased expression of this gene and the presence of antibodies against this protein are all associated with various diseases.

== Interactions ==
DEK interacts with TFAP2A.
