= TBL1X =

Protein-coding gene in the species Homo sapiens

Identifiers
- Aliases: TBL1X, EBI, SMAP55, TBL1, transducin (beta)-like 1X-linked, transducin beta like 1X-linked, transducin beta like 1 X-linked, CHNG8
- External IDs: OMIM: 300196; MGI: 1336172; GeneCards: TBL1X
Available structures
PDB	Ortholog search: PDBe RCSB
PDB	List of PDB id codes 2XTC, 2XTD, 2XTE

Gene location (Human)
Chr.	X chromosome (human)
Band	Xp22.31-p22.2	Start	9,463,320 bp
Band	Xp22.31-p22.2	End	9,741,037 bp

Gene location (Mouse)
Chr.	X chromosome (mouse)
Band	X A7.3- B|X 38.31 cM	Start	76,554,619 bp
Band	X A7.3- B|X 38.31 cM	End	76,706,589 bp
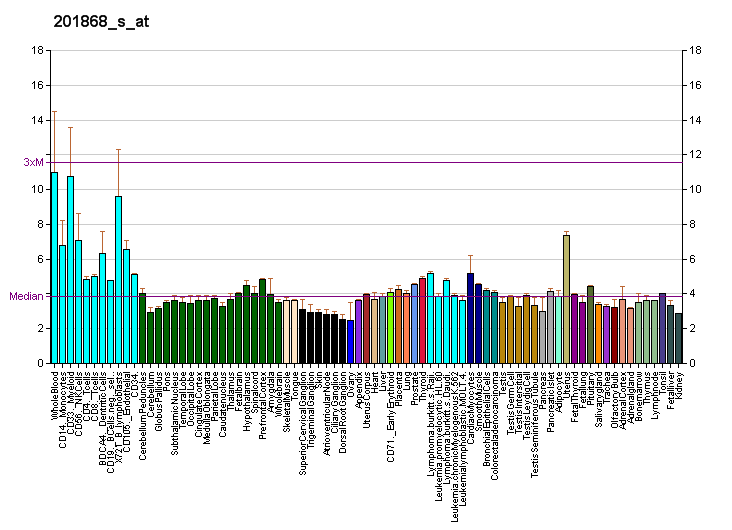

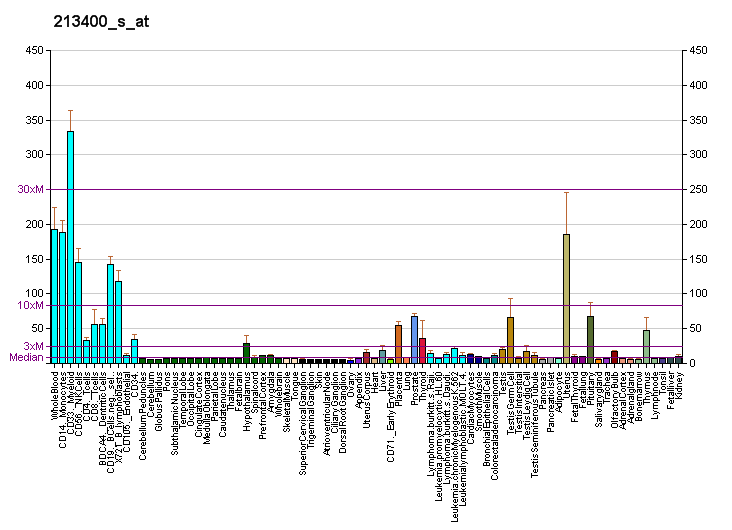

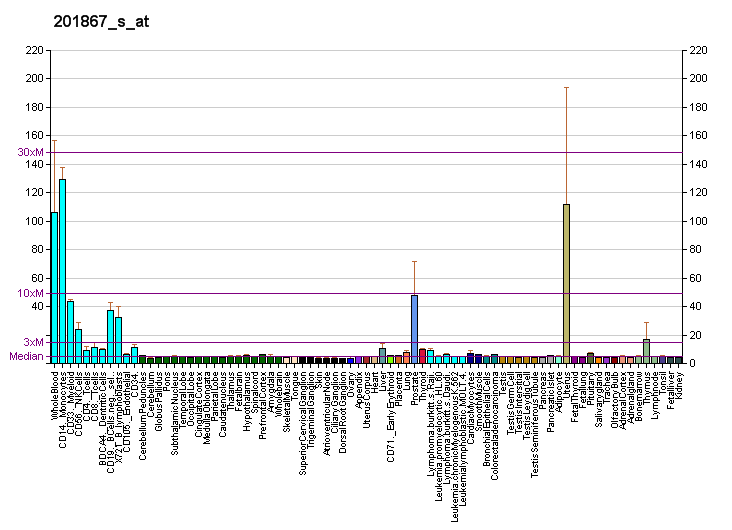
RNA expression pattern
Bgee	Human / Mouse (ortholog); Top expressed in: tail of epididymis; seminal vesicula; corpus epididymis; renal medulla; caput epididymis; buccal mucosa cell; optic nerve; dorsal motor nucleus of vagus nerve; inferior olivary nucleus; secondary oocyte / Top expressed in: tail of embryo; genital tubercle; ascending aorta; maxillary prominence; mandibular prominence; atrium; aortic valve; efferent ductule; left lung lobe; calvaria; More reference expression data
BioGPS	More reference expression data
Gene ontology
Molecular function	beta-catenin binding; transcription corepressor activity; protein domain specific binding; histone binding; transcription factor binding; protein C-terminus binding; protein binding; identical protein binding
Cellular component	histone deacetylase complex; transcription repressor complex; nucleoplasm; spindle microtubule; nucleus; mitotic spindle
Biological process	regulation of transcription, DNA-templated; negative regulation of transcription by RNA polymerase II; hearing; transcription, DNA-templated; proteolysis; positive regulation of transcription, DNA-templated; histone deacetylation; positive regulation of transcription by RNA polymerase II; proteasome-mediated ubiquitin-dependent protein catabolic process; regulation of lipid metabolic process; positive regulation of canonical Wnt signaling pathway; protein stabilization; regulation of transcription by RNA polymerase II
Sources:Amigo / QuickGO
Orthologs
Databases	NCBI: entry; OMA: entry
Species	Human	Mouse
Entrez	6907	21372
Ensembl	ENSG00000101849	ENSMUSG00000025246
UniProt	O60907	Q9QXE7
RefSeq (mRNA)	NM_001139466; NM_001139467; NM_001139468; NM_005647	NM_020601
RefSeq (protein)	NP_001132938; NP_001132939; NP_001132940; NP_005638	NP_065626
Location (UCSC)	Chr X: 9.46 – 9.74 Mb	Chr X: 76.55 – 76.71 Mb
PubMed search
- Wikidata
View/Edit Human	View/Edit Mouse

Transducin (beta)-like 1X-linked, also known as TBL1X, is a protein which in humans is encoded by the TBL1X gene.

== Function ==
The protein encoded by this gene has sequence similarity with members of the WD40 repeat-containing protein family. The WD40 group is a large family of proteins, which appear to have a regulatory function. It is believed that the WD40 repeats mediate protein-protein interactions and members of the family are involved in signal transduction, RNA processing, gene regulation, vesicular trafficking, cytoskeletal assembly and may play a role in the control of cytotypic differentiation. This encoded protein is found as a subunit in corepressor SMRT (silencing mediator for retinoid and thyroid receptors) complex along with histone deacetylase 3 protein. This gene is located adjacent to the ocular albinism gene and it is thought to be involved in the pathogenesis of the ocular albinism with late-onset sensorineural deafness phenotype. This gene is highly similar to the Y chromosome TBL1Y gene.

== Interactions ==
TBL1X has been shown to interact with:

- GPS2, and
- HDAC3,
- NCOA1, and
- NCOA2.
