= Derepression =

In genetics and cell biology, repression is a mechanism often used to decrease or inhibit the expression of a gene. Removal of repression is called derepression. This mechanism may occur at different stages in the expression of a gene, all resulting with increasing the overall RNA or protein products. Dysregulation of derepression mechanisms might result in altered gene expression patterns, which may lead to negative phenotypic consequences, such as disease.

== Derepression of Transcription ==
Transcription can be repressed in a variety of ways, and also therefore can be derepressed in different ways. A common mechanism is allosteric regulation, when a substrate binds a repressor protein and causes it to undergo a conformational change. If the repressor is bound upstream of a gene, for example in an operator sequence, then it would be repressing the gene's expression. This conformational change would take away the repressor’s ability to bind DNA, thus removing its repressive effect on transcription.

Another form of transcriptional derepression uses chromatin remodeling complexes. For transcription to occur, RNA polymerase needs to have access to the promoter sequence of the gene or it cannot bind the DNA. Sometimes these sequences are wrapped around nucleosomes or are in condensed heterochromatin regions, and are therefore inaccessible. Through different chromatin remodeling mechanisms, these promoter sequences can become accessible to the RNA polymerase, and transcription becomes derepressed.

Transcriptional derepression may also occur at the level of transcription factor activation. Certain families of transcription factors are non-functional on their own because their active domains are blocked by another part of the protein. The substrate binding to this second, regulatory domain causes a conformational change in the protein to allows access to the active domain. This lets the transcription factor bind to DNA and serve its function, thus derepressing the transcription factor.

== Derepression of Translation ==
Derepression of translation increases protein production without altering the levels of mRNA in the cell. miRNAs are a common mechanism of translation repression, binding to the mRNA through complementary base pairing to silence them. Certain RNA binding proteins have been shown to target untranslated regions of the mRNAs and upregulate the translation initiation rates by alleviating the repressive miRNA effects.

== Example of Derepression ==
=== Auxin Signalling ===
An example is the auxin mediated derepression of the auxin response factor family of transcription factors in plants. These auxin response factors are repressed by Aux/IAA repressors. In the presence of auxin, these Aux/AII proteins undergo ubiquitination and are then degraded. This derepresses the auxin response factors so they may carry out their functions in the cell.

== Altered Derepression Causing Diseases ==
=== Familial Alzheimer’s Disease ===
Alzheimer’s is a neurodegenerative disease involving progressive memory loss and other declines in brain function. One common cause of familial Alzheimer’s is mutation in the PSEN1 gene. This gene encodes a protein that cleaves certain intracellular peptides which, once free in the cytoplasm, promote CBPdegradation. Mutations in PSEN1 decrease its production or ability to cleave proteins. This derepresses the CBP proteins, and allows them to perform their function of upregulating transcription of their target genes.

=== Rett Syndrome ===
Rett syndrome is a neurodevelopmental disorder involving deterioration of learned language and motor skills, autism, and seizures starting in infancy. Many cases of Rett syndrome are associated with mutations in MECP2, a gene encoding a transcriptional repressor. Mutations in this gene decrease the levels of MeCP2 binding to different promoter sequences, resulting in their overall derepression. The increased expression of these MeCP2 regulated genes in neurons contribute to the Rett syndrome phenotype.

=== Beckwith-Wiedemann Syndrome ===
This syndrome is associated with increased susceptibility to tumors and growth abnormalities in children. A common cause of this syndrome is a mutation in an imprint control region near the Igf2 gene. This imprint control region is normally bound by an insulator on the maternal allele, which represses an enhancer from acting on the Igf2 gene. This insulator is absent on the paternal allele and allows it access to the gene. Mutations in this imprint control region inhibit the insulator from binding, which derepresses enhancer activity on the maternal Igf2 gene. This abnormal derepression and increase in gene expression can result in Beckwith-Wiedemann syndrome.
