= GPS2 (gene) =

Protein-coding gene in the species Homo sapiens

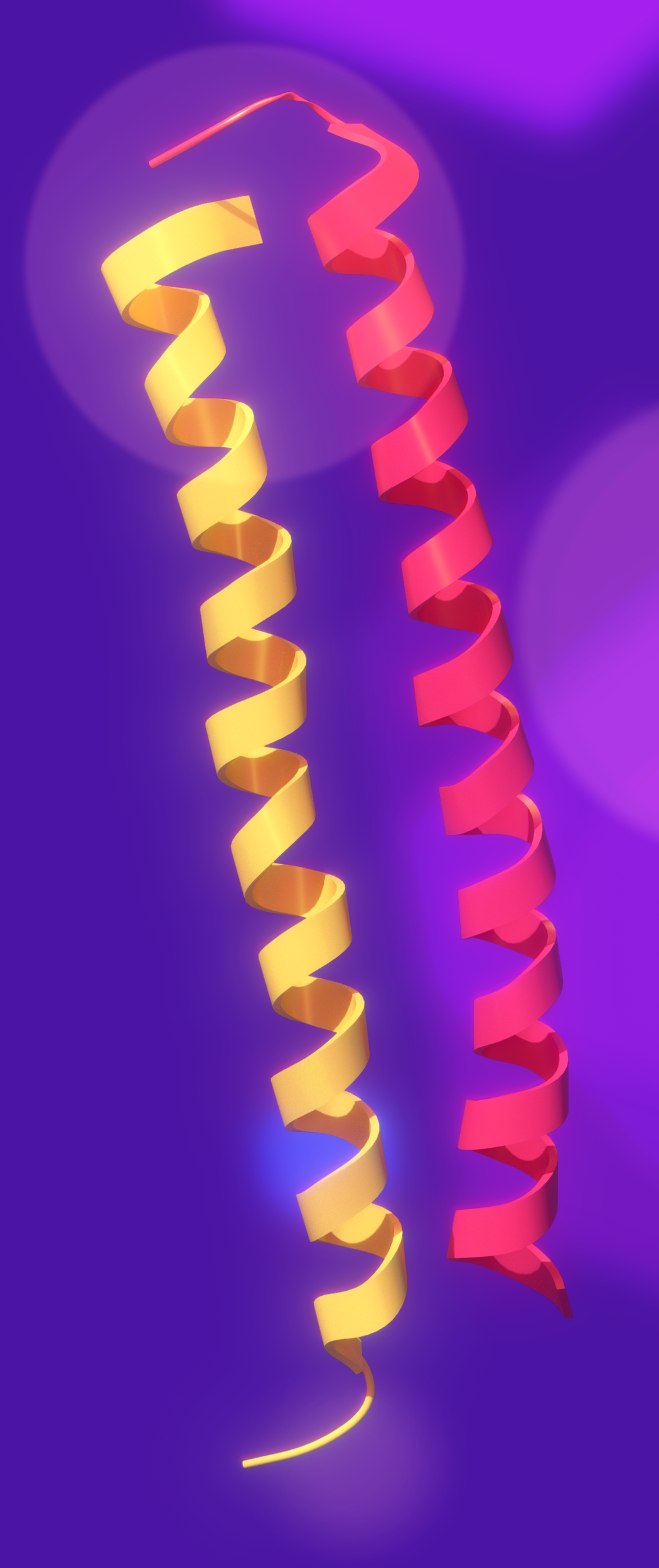

Identifiers
- Aliases: GPS2, AMF-1, G protein pathway suppressor 2
- External IDs: OMIM: 601935; MGI: 1891751; GeneCards: GPS2
Available structures
| PDB | Ortholog search: PDBe RCSB |
| PDB | List of PDB id codes 2L5G |

Gene location (Human)
| Chr. | Chromosome 17 (human) |
| Band | 17p13.1 | Start | 7,311,324 bp |
| Band | 17p13.1 | End | 7,315,564 bp |

Gene location (Mouse)
| Chr. | Chromosome 11 (mouse) |
| Band | 11|11 B3 | Start | 69,804,714 bp |
| Band | 11|11 B3 | End | 69,807,417 bp |
RNA expression pattern
| Bgee | Human / Mouse (ortholog); Top expressed in: left testis; right testis; sural nerve; muscle of thigh; gastrocnemius muscle; pituitary gland; anterior pituitary; granulocyte; apex of heart; right lobe of thyroid gland / Top expressed in: neural layer of retina; granulocyte; muscle of thigh; tail of embryo; genital tubercle; lip; seminiferous tubule; yolk sac; ventricular zone; morula; More reference expression data |
| BioGPS | n/a |
Gene ontology
| Molecular function | GTPase inhibitor activity; protein binding; cyclin binding; transcription coactivator activity; transcription corepressor activity |
| Cellular component | nucleoplasm; nucleus; cytoplasm; mitochondrion; transcription repressor complex; cytosol |
| Biological process | JNK cascade; negative regulation of GTPase activity; negative regulation of fat cell differentiation; negative regulation of transcription by RNA polymerase II; negative regulation of tumor necrosis factor-mediated signaling pathway; positive regulation of cholesterol efflux; regulation of lipid metabolic process; B cell differentiation; negative regulation of toll-like receptor signaling pathway; positive regulation of peroxisome proliferator activated receptor signaling pathway; regulation of fat cell differentiation; positive regulation of transcription by RNA polymerase II; negative regulation of JNK cascade; negative regulation of inflammatory response; negative regulation of B cell receptor signaling pathway; response to mitochondrial depolarisation; negative regulation of protein K63-linked ubiquitination; transcription, DNA-templated; regulation of transcription, DNA-templated; viral process |
Sources:Amigo / QuickGO
Orthologs
| Databases | NCBI: entry; OMA: entry |
| Species | Human | Mouse |
| Entrez | 2874 | 56310 |
| Ensembl | ENSG00000132522 | ENSMUSG00000023170 |
| UniProt | Q13227 | Q921N8 |
| RefSeq (mRNA) | NM_004489 | NM_019726; NM_001357906 |
| RefSeq (protein) | NP_004480 | NP_001344835; NP_062700 |
| Location (UCSC) | Chr 17: 7.31 – 7.32 Mb | Chr 11: 69.8 – 69.81 Mb |
| PubMed search |
- Wikidata
| View/Edit Human | View/Edit Mouse |

G protein pathway suppressor 2 is a protein that in humans is encoded by the GPS2 gene.

== Function ==
This gene encodes a protein involved in G protein-mitogen-activated protein kinase (MAPK) signaling cascades. When overexpressed in mammalian cells, this gene could potently suppress a RAS- and MAPK-mediated signal and interfere with JNK activity, suggesting that the function of this gene may be signal repression. The encoded protein is an integral subunit of the NCOR1-HDAC3 (nuclear receptor corepressor 1-histone deacetylase 3) complex, and it was shown that the complex inhibits JNK activation through this subunit and thus could potentially provide an alternative mechanism for hormone-mediated antagonism of AP1 (activator protein 1) function.

== Interactions ==
GPS2 (gene) has been shown to interact with:

- C21orf7,
- Cyclin A1,
- EP300,
- HDAC3,
- NCOR1,
- P53, and
- TBL1X.
