= Adenovirus early region 1A =

Gene expressed during adenovirus replication to produce E1A proteins

Adenovirus early region 1A (E1A) is a gene expressed during adenovirus replication to produce a variety of E1A proteins. It is expressed during the early phase of the viral life span.

E1A encodes two major proteins in Ad5, translated after alternative splicing of the viral DNA transcript, that are able to cause a variety of different effects in mammalian cells. The proteins encoded by E1A tend to localize in the nucleus and affect genetic regulation by the host cell. After viral infection, they stimulate expression of other viral genes and can either enhance or repress expression of cellular genes depending on cellular context and coordination with other viral genes.

The addition of E1A DNA into cells may cause adverse biological effects, such as increasing p53 expression, stimulating DNA synthesis and cell cycle progression in quiescent cells, and inhibiting differentiation. It has been considered an oncogene. It can also behave as a tumour suppressor gene.

== Transcription ==
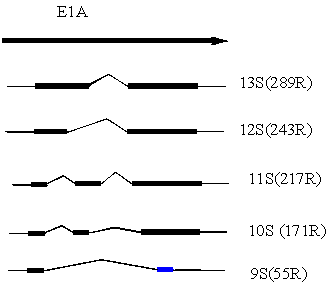
Figure 1: Structure of the E1A mRNA transcripts, coding regions are represented as boxes

The adenovirus genetic information is encoded by a double stranded linear DNA molecule. During viral replication, adenovirus early region 1A (E1A) is a gene that is expressed. The majority of work on adenovirus transcription has focused on human adenovirus, specifically Ad2 and Ad5. The complete nucleotide sequence of E1A has been established, and the overall organization of this region appears to be very similar to that of the various serotypes.

Almost an hour after viral infection, the virus undergoes transcription to form a primary gene E1A which undergoes alternative splicing, a regulated process where multiple protein isoforms are encoded by a primary gene via exons, parts of exons or introns being differentially joined or skipped. The E1A is spliced differentially into five transcripts with sedimentation coefficients of 13S, 12S, 11S, 10S and 9S, all of which have been known to code for different proteins with varying numbers of amino acid residues of 289R, 243R, 217R, 171R, 55R, respectively, each performing different functions. The 289R and 243R proteins are the major products encoded by the E1A of Ad5. These two proteins share almost the same internal sequences as shown in the figure except for the 46 internal amino acids unique to the 289 protein which is as a result of the differential splicing. These proteins are functionally important for growth of adenoviruses.

== Translation ==
The adenovirus early region 1A gene is translated to produce E1A proteins by using the host cell’s molecular machinery. Early proteins are produced after the virus enters the host cell, but before replication. This is in contrast to late proteins which are produced from late phase genes. Early proteins typically encode non-structural proteins that are necessary for replication, whereas late structural proteins typically function to initiate gene expression. The E1A gene refers to the gene that encodes E1A proteins specifically involved in adenovirus replication.

In the adenovirus, the final translation products, or E1A proteins, are proline-rich and have been found to localize in the nucleus. These protein products play a role in regulating the gene itself and in growth activities of the virus.

The mRNA transcripts, 13S, 12S, 11S, 10S and 9S, each code for the following respective protein residues: 289 residue (R), 243R, 217R, 171R and 55R. These products are involved in the regulation of viral genes as well as the genes in the infected cell.

Adenovirus protein regulation of viral genes has been studied in adenovirus type-5, or Ad5. Ad5 refers to a specific group of human adenoviruses. In Ad5-infected cells, E1A translation was hypothesized to involve the Ad5 L4 100-kDa protein. It was concluded that this protein is involved in translation initiation for subsequent late phase proteins.

With regards to cellular translation of the host cell, it has been concluded that adenovirus selectively inhibits cellular translation via displacement of MAP kinase-interacting serine/threonine-protein kinase 1 (Mnk1), a eukaryotic translation initiation factor. Adenovirus likely displaces Mnk1 from eIF4G and inhibits eIF4E phosphorylation, both of which are important components of the eIF4a translation initiation complex in cells. While adenovirus likely blocks cellular translation in this way, it does not affect the translation of its own viral mRNAs.

== Structures of protein products ==
The adenovirus early region 1A (E1A) 289R protein is composed of 289 amino acids, with four conserved regions: CR1 (42-80), CR2 (115-137), CR3 (145-191), CR4 (240-289). In 243R, the CR3 is absent. These conserved domains are responsible for the protein-protein interaction and the regulation of cell cycling and cellular responses. Overall, the intrinsic structure of E1A is highly disordered, meaning that it lacks a single, three-dimensional structure.

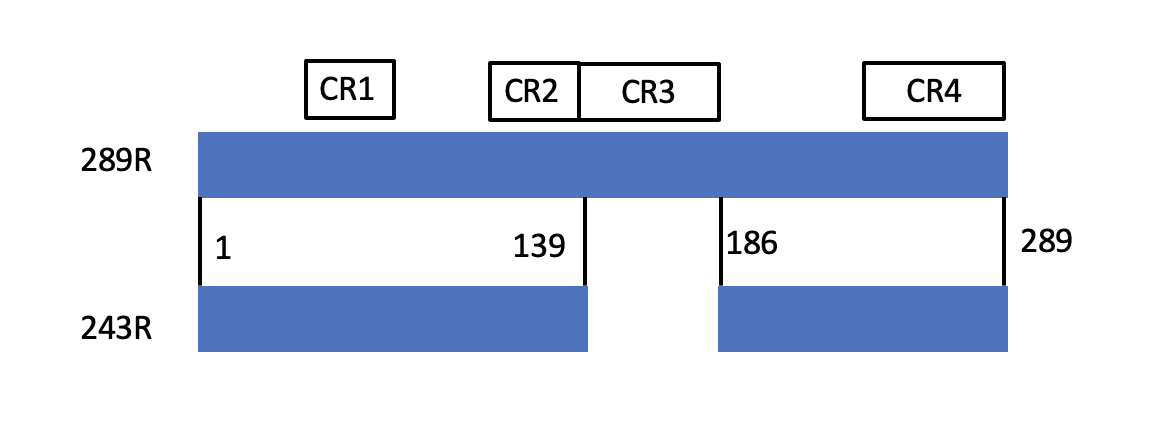
Figure 2: The construct of E1A proteins.

However, the structure of E1A can be fixed upon the ligand binding. The structure of cyclic-AMP response element binding protein (CBP) and E1A complex was determined by NMR. It reveals that CR1 and CR2 are responsible for the CBP interaction to regulate the cell transformation. The CR1 domain is formed by the random coils without advanced structure in free state. However, when bound to the zinc finger-2 domain of CBP, it folds into a helical structure.

The CR3 is a distinct domain in 289R since it is the only domain with advanced structure. The fixed structure allows this domain to recognize TATA-binding protein (TBP) and activate transcription of certain genes. The residue Val147 within CR3 is a critical residue for the TBP interaction. It is proposed that the mutation of Val will interrupt the hydrophobic environments at the binding site leading to a disabling of the TBP interaction, indicating the structure of CR3 is a key domain for TBP interaction.

== Role in viral life cycle ==
It has been found that the E1A C-terminus (encoded by the second exon) is heavily influential in adenovirus replicative cycle, impacting processes of replication, localization, growth, gene expression, protein expression, and notably induction of the S-Phase. This particularly encoded C-Terminus region is characteristic of all E1A isoforms with the exception of 55 residues protein.

By examining binding factors, scientist have better understood the impacts of the C-terminus on viral life cycle: E1A direct binding of RubBL1 repressing gene activation induced by interferons, and Ku70 being an inhibitor of DNA response to damage. Additionally, mutations observed on the E1A C-terminus were found to have impacts on S-phase induction and deletions to the terminus showed varying impacts on growth of virus. However, while we are aware of some of the ways C-terminus works to impact viral life cycle, a comprehensive understanding is not yet fully understood.

== Effects on host cell ==
The natural host cell-type targeted by adenoviruses are G_{0}-arrested quiescent cells, and it has been proposed that for this reason adenovirus genes stimulate proliferation of these cells in order to maximize viral replication. Proteins encoded by E1A can have varying effects on host cellular operations as well as its host organism, depending on many factors, most notably on if the gene is acting alone or in cooperativity with other adenovirus genes, such as E1B. On its own, E1A is able to affect gene function in order to stimulate quiescent cells to divide, repress differentiation, and induce apoptosis. When in coordination with E1B or other oncogenic genes such as activated ras, E1A is able to transform rodent cells oncogenically.

It has been found that within 24 hours of expression on its own, E1A binds transiently to gene clusters/promoters involved in pathogen and immune response as well as those regulating cell growth, development, differentiation, division, and DNA synthesis in human fibroblast cells, with the effect of repressing their activation. Additionally, E1A is able to reprogram cells on an epigenetic basis. Interaction of E1A with p300/CBP histone acetyltransferases causes a reduction in total cellular acetylation of H3K18 by roughly a factor of 3, which may be similar in mechanism to nonviral forms of oncogenesis. The combined effect of E1A promoter binding and epigenetic changes act to promote host cell entry into S phase and repress differentiation.

E1A protein products interfere with host immunity through a number of distinct interactions with innate cellular signalling pathways. By blocking transcription complex formation by binding transcription factors, preventing ubiquitination of certain histones, and blocking peptide degradation by the immunoproteasome, E1A is able to reduce antigen presentation on adenovirus-infected cells and disrupt the cell’s innate immune response.
