= CDC6 =

Protein-coding gene in humans

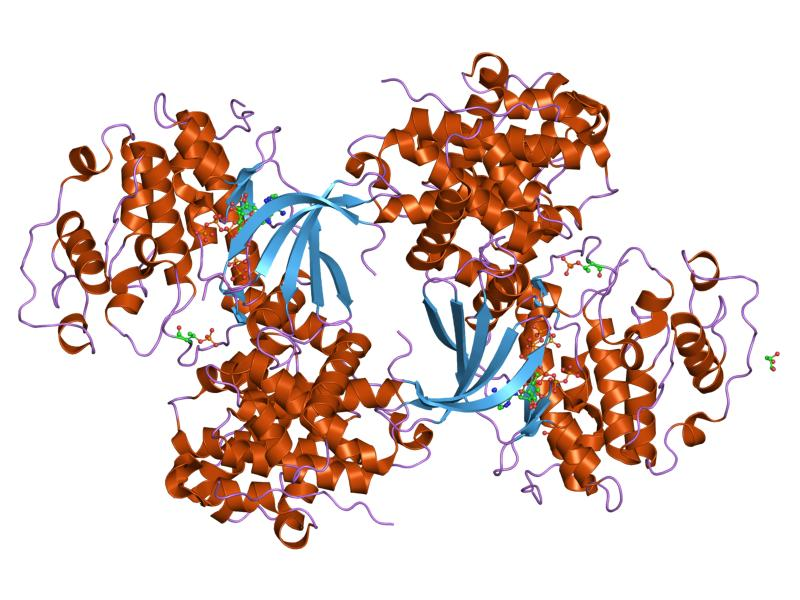
Available structures
PDB	Ortholog search: PDBe RCSB
PDB	List of PDB id codes 2CCH, 2CCI, 4I5L, 4I5N

Identifiers
- Aliases: CDC6, CDC18L, HsCDC18, Hscell division cycle 6, MGORS5
- External IDs: OMIM: 602627; MGI: 1345150; HomoloGene: 68172; GeneCards: CDC6; OMA:CDC6 - orthologs

Gene location (Human)
Chr.	Chromosome 17 (human)
Band	17q21.2	Start	40,287,879 bp
Band	17q21.2	End	40,304,657 bp

Gene location (Mouse)
Chr.	Chromosome 11 (mouse)
Band	11|11 D	Start	98,798,627 bp
Band	11|11 D	End	98,814,766 bp
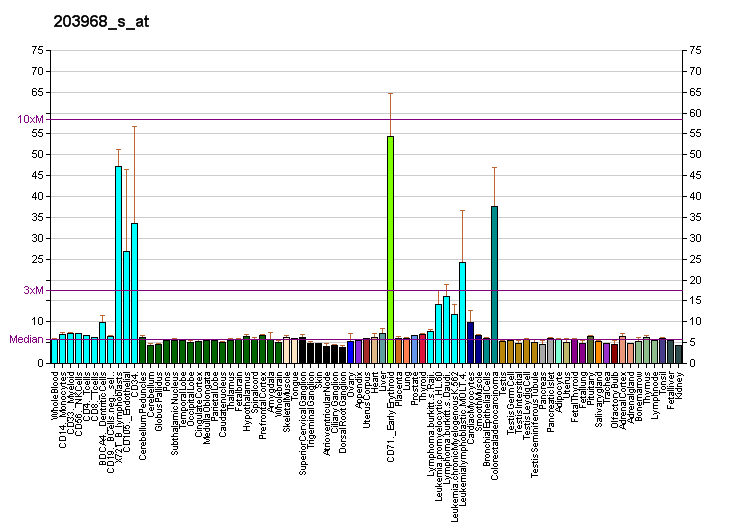

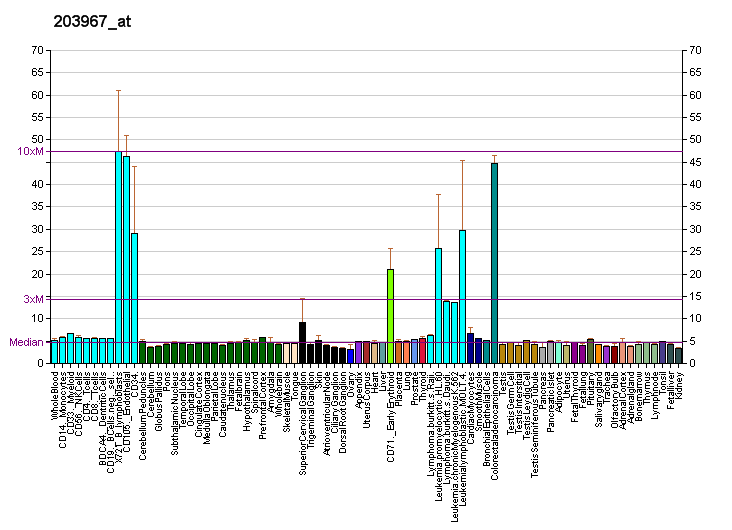
RNA expression pattern
Bgee	Human / Mouse (ortholog); Top expressed in: ventricular zone; ganglionic eminence; secondary oocyte; testicle; rectum; stromal cell of endometrium; mucosa of transverse colon; bone marrow cells; appendix; gonad / Top expressed in: fetal liver hematopoietic progenitor cell; primitive streak; epiblast; abdominal wall; morula; primary oocyte; morula; otic placode; endocardial cushion; mandibular prominence; More reference expression data
BioGPS	More reference expression data
Gene ontology
Molecular function	nucleotide binding; kinase binding; protein binding; ATP binding; DNA replication origin binding
Cellular component	spindle pole; spindle midzone; nucleus; cytoplasm; nucleolus; nucleoplasm; cytosol
Biological process	regulation of cyclin-dependent protein serine/threonine kinase activity; cellular response to vasopressin; positive regulation of fibroblast proliferation; negative regulation of DNA replication; regulation of transcription involved in G1/S transition of mitotic cell cycle; cell division; positive regulation of cytokinesis; DNA replication checkpoint signaling; DNA replication; cellular response to angiotensin; DNA replication initiation; traversing start control point of mitotic cell cycle; positive regulation of chromosome segregation; positive regulation of cyclin-dependent protein serine/threonine kinase activity; regulation of mitotic metaphase/anaphase transition; cell cycle; negative regulation of cell population proliferation; mitotic cell cycle; G1/S transition of mitotic cell cycle; mitotic DNA replication checkpoint signaling
Sources:Amigo / QuickGO
Orthologs
Species	Human	Mouse
Entrez	990	23834
Ensembl	ENSG00000094804	ENSMUSG00000017499
UniProt	Q99741	O89033
RefSeq (mRNA)	NM_001254	NM_001025779; NM_011799; NM_001362735
RefSeq (protein)	NP_001245	NP_001020950; NP_035929; NP_001349664
Location (UCSC)	Chr 17: 40.29 – 40.3 Mb	Chr 11: 98.8 – 98.81 Mb
PubMed search
- Wikidata
View/Edit Human	View/Edit Mouse

Cell division control protein 6 homolog is a protein that in humans is encoded by the CDC6 gene.

The protein encoded by this gene is highly similar to Saccharomyces cerevisiae Cdc6, a protein essential for the initiation of DNA replication. This protein functions as a regulator at the early steps of DNA replication. It localizes in the cell nucleus during cell cycle phase G1, but translocates to the cytoplasm at the start of S phase. The subcellular translocation of this protein during the cell cycle is regulated through its phosphorylation by cyclin-dependent kinases. Transcription of this protein was reported to be regulated in response to mitogenic signals through a transcriptional control mechanism involving E2F proteins.

== Interactions ==
CDC6 has been shown to interact with ORC1L, ORC2L, Cyclin A2, PPP2R3B, MCM3, PPP2R3A, MCM7 and PSKH1.

== See also ==
- Cdc6, the family of orthologs in eukaryotes
