= PROX2 =

Protein

Identifiers
- Aliases: PROX2, PROX-2, prospero homeobox 2
- External IDs: OMIM: 615094; MGI: 1920672; GeneCards: PROX2

Gene location (Human)
Chr.	Chromosome 14 (human)
Band	14q24.3	Start	74,852,871 bp
Band	14q24.3	End	74,876,154 bp
RNA expression pattern
Bgee	Human / Mouse (ortholog); Top expressed in: testicle; stromal cell of endometrium; granulocyte; right ovary; ganglionic eminence; left ovary; canal of the cervix; right uterine tube; right lobe of thyroid gland; body of uterus / n/a; More reference expression data
BioGPS	n/a
Gene ontology
Molecular function	DNA binding; DNA-binding transcription repressor activity, RNA polymerase II-specific; DNA-binding transcription factor activity, RNA polymerase II-specific
Cellular component	nucleus
Biological process	cardiac muscle cell differentiation; regulation of transcription, DNA-templated; negative regulation of transcription by RNA polymerase II; transcription, DNA-templated; neuron differentiation; positive regulation of transcription by RNA polymerase II; lymphangiogenesis; lymphatic endothelial cell differentiation; lens fiber cell morphogenesis
Sources:Amigo / QuickGO
Orthologs
Databases	NCBI: entry; OMA: entry
Species	Human	Mouse
Entrez	283571	73422
Ensembl	ENSG00000119608	n/a
UniProt	Q3B8N5	Q8BII1
RefSeq (mRNA)	NM_001080408; NM_001243007; NM_001384314; NM_173606	NM_175198; NM_001361238; NM_001361239
RefSeq (protein)	NP_001073877; NP_001229936	NP_780407; NP_001348167; NP_001348168
Location (UCSC)	Chr 14: 74.85 – 74.88 Mb	n/a
PubMed search
- Wikidata
View/Edit Human	View/Edit Mouse

Prospero homeobox protein 2 is a protein that in humans is encoded by the PROX2 gene.
