= HNRPU =

Protein-coding gene in humans

HNRNPU

Identifiers
- Aliases: HNRNPU, HNRPU, SAF-A, U21.1, hnRNP U, SAFA, HNRNPU-AS1, heterogeneous nuclear ribonucleoprotein U (scaffold attachment factor A), heterogeneous nuclear ribonucleoprotein U, HNRNPU antisense RNA 1, C1orf199, NCRNA00201, EIEE54, pp120, GRIP120, DEE54
- External IDs: OMIM: 602869; MGI: 1858195; GeneCards: HNRNPU
Available structures
PDB	Ortholog search: PDBe RCSB
PDB	List of PDB id codes 1ZRJ

Gene location (Human)
Chr.	Chromosome 1 (human)
Band	1q44	Start	244,840,638 bp
Band	1q44	End	244,864,560 bp
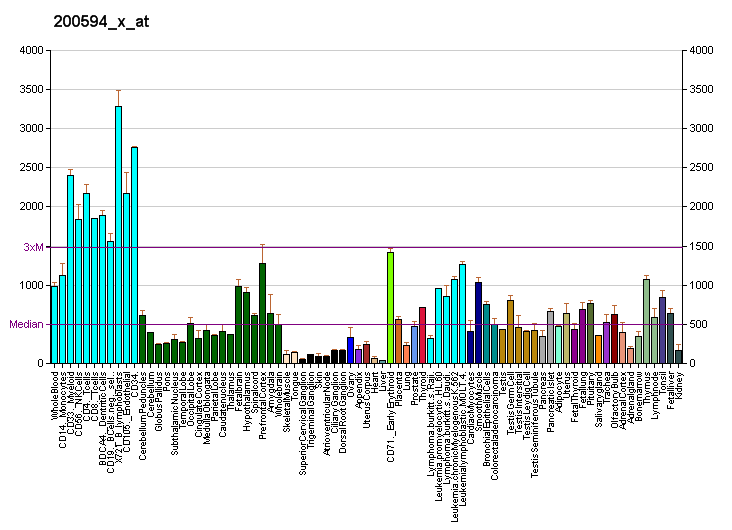

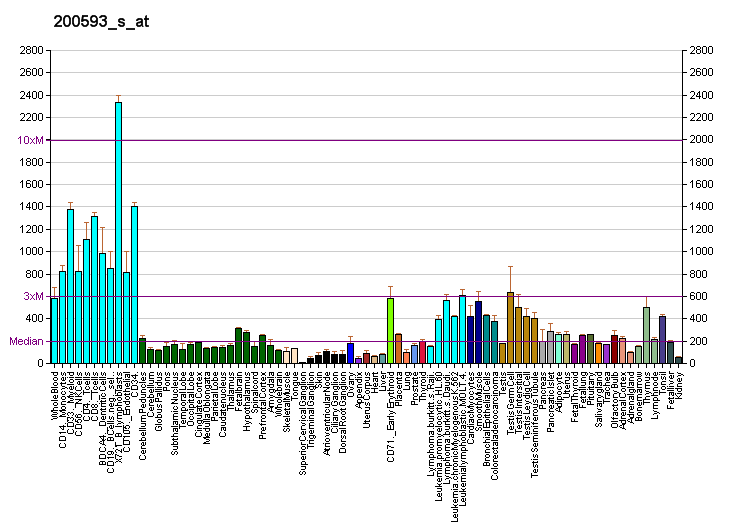

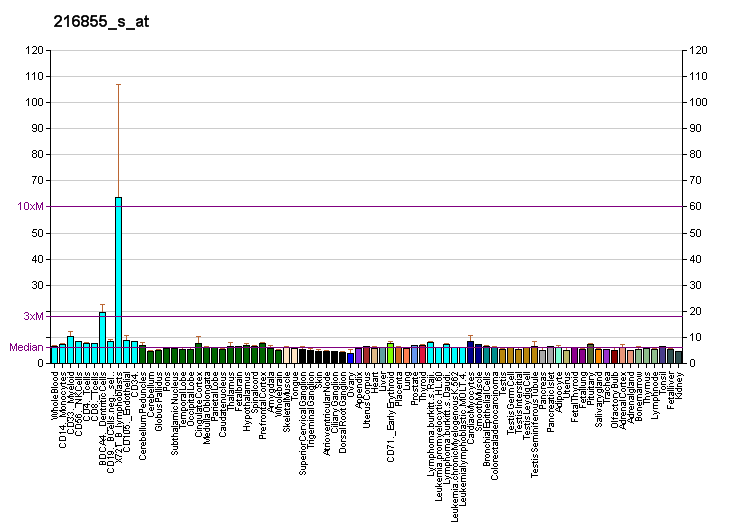
RNA expression pattern
Bgee	Human / Mouse (ortholog); Top expressed in: sperm; ventricular zone; ganglionic eminence; tendon of biceps brachii; caput epididymis; Achilles tendon; bronchial epithelial cell; epithelium of colon; trabecular bone; corpus epididymis / n/a; More reference expression data
BioGPS	More reference expression data
Gene ontology
Molecular function	nucleotide binding; protein binding; telomerase RNA binding; RNA binding; RNA polymerase II complex binding; TFIIH-class transcription factor complex binding; DNA binding; chromatin binding; double-stranded DNA binding; single-stranded DNA binding; transcription corepressor activity; double-stranded RNA binding; single-stranded RNA binding; mRNA 3'-UTR binding; actin binding; poly(A) binding; snRNA binding; poly(C) RNA binding; chromatin DNA binding; poly(G) binding; pre-mRNA binding; ribonucleoprotein complex binding; protein-containing complex binding; sequence-specific double-stranded DNA binding; ATP binding; identical protein binding; sequence-specific DNA binding; RNA polymerase II C-terminal domain binding; promoter-specific chromatin binding; RNA polymerase II cis-regulatory region sequence-specific DNA binding
Cellular component	CRD-mediated mRNA stability complex; cytoplasm; catalytic step 2 spliceosome; membrane; nucleoplasm; telomerase holoenzyme complex; cytoplasmic ribonucleoprotein granule; spliceosomal complex; nucleus; extracellular matrix; nuclear chromosome; cell surface; nuclear matrix; nuclear speck; protein-containing complex; RNA polymerase II transcription regulator complex; inactive sex chromosome; ribonucleoprotein complex; kinetochore; centrosome; midbody; mitotic spindle; mitotic spindle midzone; mitotic spindle microtubule; chromosome, centromeric region; spindle pole; chromosome; microtubule organizing center; spindle; cytoskeleton; dendrite cytoplasm
Biological process	CRD-mediated mRNA stabilization; mRNA splicing, via spliceosome; RNA processing; negative regulation of telomere maintenance via telomerase; rhythmic process; mRNA processing; osteoblast differentiation; RNA splicing; RNA metabolic process; positive regulation of gene expression; circadian regulation of gene expression; cardiac muscle cell development; cellular response to dexamethasone stimulus; negative regulation of transcription by RNA polymerase II; regulation of alternative mRNA splicing, via spliceosome; dosage compensation by inactivation of X chromosome; negative regulation of kinase activity; negative regulation of transcription elongation from RNA polymerase II promoter; mRNA stabilization; maintenance of protein location in nucleus; cellular response to glucocorticoid stimulus; RNA localization to chromatin; positive regulation of DNA topoisomerase (ATP-hydrolyzing) activity; positive regulation of stem cell proliferation; regulation of mitotic cell cycle; positive regulation of transcription by RNA polymerase II; regulation of mitotic spindle assembly; regulation of chromatin organization; positive regulation of attachment of mitotic spindle microtubules to kinetochore; protein localization to spindle microtubule; cellular response to leukemia inhibitory factor; negative regulation of stem cell differentiation; chromatin organization; cell cycle; multicellular organism development; cell differentiation; cell division; positive regulation of brown fat cell differentiation; dendritic transport of messenger ribonucleoprotein complex; adaptive thermogenesis
Sources:Amigo / QuickGO
Orthologs
Databases	NCBI: entry; OMA: entry
Species	Human	Mouse
Entrez	3192	51810
Ensembl	ENSG00000153187	ENSMUSG00000039630
UniProt	Q00839; Q5RI18	Q8VEK3
RefSeq (mRNA)	NM_004501; NM_031844	NM_016805
RefSeq (protein)	NP_004492; NP_114032	NP_058085
Location (UCSC)	Chr 1: 244.84 – 244.86 Mb	n/a
PubMed search
- Wikidata
View/Edit Human	View/Edit Mouse

Heterogeneous nuclear ribonucleoprotein U is a protein that in humans is encoded by the HNRNPU gene.

== Function ==
This gene belongs to the subfamily of ubiquitously expressed heterogeneous nuclear ribonucleoproteins (hnRNPs). The hnRNPs are RNA binding proteins that form complexes with heterogeneous nuclear RNA (hnRNA). These proteins are associated with pre-mRNAs in the nucleus and appear to influence pre-mRNA processing and other aspects of mRNA metabolism and transport. While all of the hnRNPs are present in the nucleus, some seem to shuttle between the nucleus and the cytoplasm. The hnRNP proteins have distinct nucleic acid binding properties. The protein encoded by this gene contains a RNA binding domain and scaffold-associated region (SAR)-specific bipartite DNA-binding domain. This protein is also thought to be involved in the packaging of hnRNA into large ribonucleoprotein complexes. During apoptosis, this protein is cleaved in a caspase-dependent way. Cleavage occurs at the SALD site, resulting in a loss of DNA-binding activity and a concomitant detachment of this protein from nuclear structural sites. But this cleavage does not affect the function of the encoded protein in RNA metabolism. At least two alternatively spliced transcript variants have been identified for this gene.

== Interactions ==
HNRPU has been shown to interact with:

- EP300,
- GTF2F1,
- Glucocorticoid receptor, and
- NDN.
