= Cyclin A1 =

Protein-coding gene in the species Homo sapiens

CCNA1

Identifiers
- Aliases: CCNA1, CT146, Cyclin A1
- External IDs: OMIM: 604036; MGI: 108042; GeneCards: CCNA1

Gene location (Human)
Chr.	Chromosome 13 (human)
Band	13q13.3	Start	36,431,520 bp
Band	13q13.3	End	36,442,870 bp

Gene location (Mouse)
Chr.	Chromosome 3 (mouse)
Band	3|3 C	Start	54,952,890 bp
Band	3|3 C	End	54,962,922 bp
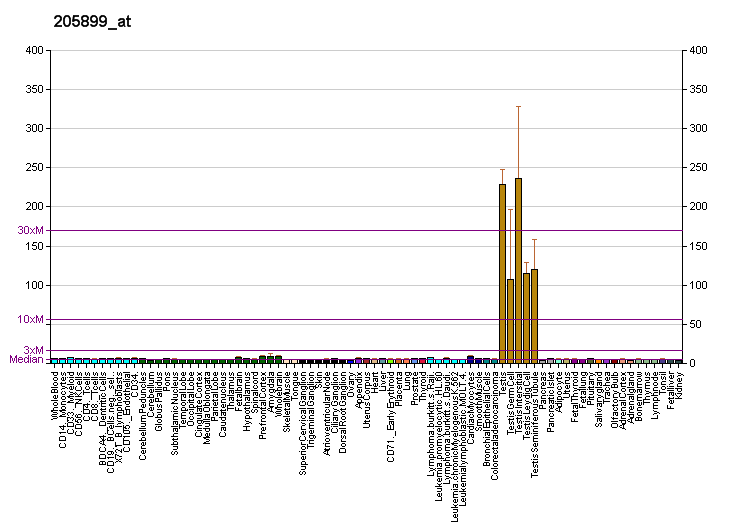
RNA expression pattern
Bgee	Human / Mouse (ortholog); Top expressed in: sperm; left testis; right testis; ventricular zone; right uterine tube; ganglionic eminence; testicle; middle temporal gyrus; prefrontal cortex; nucleus accumbens / Top expressed in: spermatid; spermatocyte; seminiferous tubule; embryo; embryo; ventricular zone; left lung lobe; granulocyte; primary visual cortex; superior frontal gyrus; More reference expression data
BioGPS	More reference expression data
Gene ontology
Molecular function	protein binding; protein kinase activity; cyclin-dependent protein serine/threonine kinase regulator activity; protein kinase binding
Cellular component	microtubule cytoskeleton; cytosol; nucleus; nucleoplasm; cyclin A1-CDK2 complex; cyclin-dependent protein kinase holoenzyme complex; cytoplasm; cyclin A2-CDK2 complex
Biological process	cell division; cell cycle; male meiosis I; regulation of transcription involved in G1/S transition of mitotic cell cycle; spermatogenesis; protein deubiquitination; regulation of cyclin-dependent protein serine/threonine kinase activity; mitotic cell cycle; protein phosphorylation; regulation of mitotic nuclear division; positive regulation of cell population proliferation; positive regulation of cell cycle; mitotic cell cycle phase transition
Sources:Amigo / QuickGO
Orthologs
Databases	NCBI: entry; OMA: entry
Species	Human	Mouse
Entrez	8900	12427
Ensembl	ENSG00000133101	ENSMUSG00000027793
UniProt	P78396	Q61456
RefSeq (mRNA)	NM_001111045; NM_001111046; NM_001111047; NM_003914	NM_007628; NM_001305221
RefSeq (protein)	NP_001104515; NP_001104516; NP_001104517; NP_003905	NP_001292150; NP_031654
Location (UCSC)	Chr 13: 36.43 – 36.44 Mb	Chr 3: 54.95 – 54.96 Mb
PubMed search
- Wikidata
View/Edit Human	View/Edit Mouse

Cyclin-A1 is a protein that in humans is encoded by the CCNA1 gene.

== Function ==
The protein encoded by this gene belongs to the highly conserved cyclin family, whose members are characterized by a dramatic periodicity in protein abundance through the cell division cycle. Cyclins function as activating subunits of enzymatic complex together with cyclin-dependent kinases (CDKs). Different cyclins exhibit distinct expression and degradation patterns that contribute to the temporal coordination of cell cycle events. Cyclin A1 was shown to be expressed in testis and brain, as well as in several leukemic cell lines, and is thought to primarily function in the control of meiosis. This cyclin binds both Cdk1 and Cdk2 kinases, which give two distinct kinase activities, one appearing in S phase, the other in G2, and thus regulate separate functions in cell cycle. This cyclin was found to bind to important cell cycle regulators, such as Rb family proteins, transcription factor E2F1, and the Kip/Cip family of CDK-inhibitor proteins.

== Interactions ==
Cyclin-A1 interacts with:

- CDC20,
- Cyclin-dependent kinase 2,
- E2F1,
- GNB2L1,
- GPS2,
- MYBL2, and
- Retinoblastoma protein.
