= Activating protein 2 =

Family of transcription factors

transcription factor AP-2 alpha (activating enhancer binding protein 2 alpha)

Identifiers
- Symbol: TFAP2A
- Alt. symbols: TFAP2, AP2TF
- NCBI gene: 7020
- HGNC: 11742
- OMIM: 107580
- RefSeq: NM_003220
- UniProt: P05549

Other data
- Locus: Chr. 6 p22.3
Search for
- Structures: Swiss-model
- Domains: InterPro

transcription factor AP-2 beta (activating enhancer binding protein 2 beta)

Identifiers
- Symbol: TFAP2B
- Alt. symbols: AP2-B
- NCBI gene: 7021
- HGNC: 11743
- OMIM: 601601
- RefSeq: NM_003221
- UniProt: Q92481

Other data
- Locus: Chr. 6 p12
Search for
- Structures: Swiss-model
- Domains: InterPro

transcription factor AP-2 gamma (activating enhancer binding protein 2 gamma)

Identifiers
- Symbol: TFAP2C
- NCBI gene: 7022
- HGNC: 11744
- OMIM: 601602
- RefSeq: NM_003222
- UniProt: Q92754

Other data
- Locus: Chr. 20 q13.2
Search for
- Structures: Swiss-model
- Domains: InterPro

transcription factor AP-2 delta (activating enhancer binding protein 2 delta)

Identifiers
- Symbol: TFAP2D
- Alt. symbols: TFAP2BL1
- NCBI gene: 83741
- HGNC: 15581
- OMIM: 610161
- RefSeq: NM_172238
- UniProt: Q7Z6R9

Other data
- Locus: Chr. 6 p12.3
Search for
- Structures: Swiss-model
- Domains: InterPro

transcription factor AP-2 epsilon (activating enhancer binding protein 2 epsilon)

Identifiers
- Symbol: TFAP2E
- Alt. symbols: AP2E
- NCBI gene: 339488
- HGNC: 30774
- RefSeq: NM_178548
- UniProt: Q6VUC0

Other data
- Locus: Chr. 1 p34.3
Search for
- Structures: Swiss-model
- Domains: InterPro

Activating Protein 2 (AP-2) is a family of closely related transcription factors which plays a critical role in regulating gene expression during early development.
