= CDC25A =

Protein-coding gene in humans

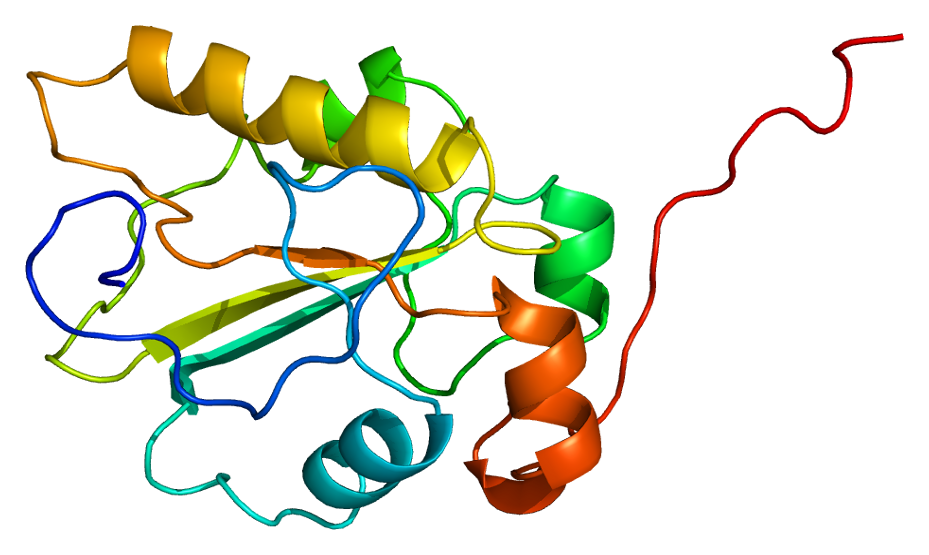

Identifiers
- Aliases: CDC25A, CDC25A2, cell division cycle 25A
- External IDs: OMIM: 116947; MGI: 103198; GeneCards: CDC25A
Available structures
PDB	Ortholog search: PDBe RCSB
PDB	List of PDB id codes 1C25
Enzyme activity
EC #	BRENDA	ExPASy	KEGG	MetaCyc
3.1.3.48	↗	↗	↗	↗

Gene location (Human)
Chr.	Chromosome 3 (human)
Band	3p21.31	Start	48,157,146 bp
Band	3p21.31	End	48,188,417 bp

Gene location (Mouse)
Chr.	Chromosome 9 (mouse)
Band	9 F2|9 59.81 cM	Start	109,704,647 bp
Band	9 F2|9 59.81 cM	End	109,722,963 bp
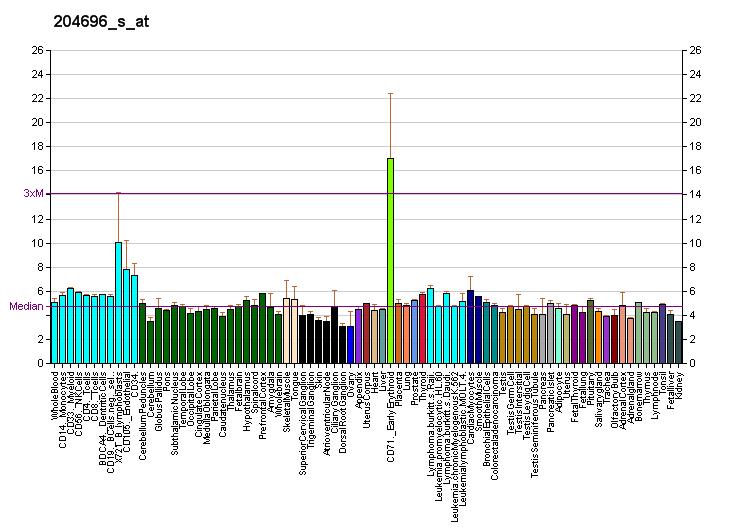

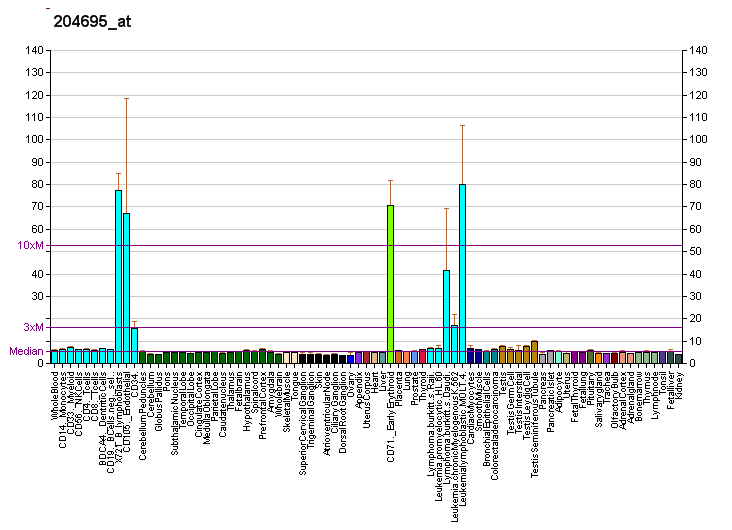
RNA expression pattern
Bgee	Human / Mouse (ortholog); Top expressed in: secondary oocyte; testicle; buccal mucosa cell; embryo; sperm; ventricular zone; trabecular bone; ganglionic eminence; gonad; bone marrow / Top expressed in: otic placode; otic vesicle; saccule; tail of embryo; genital tubercle; primitive streak; tibiofemoral joint; primary oocyte; epiblast; somite; More reference expression data
BioGPS	More reference expression data
Gene ontology
Molecular function	protein binding; protein tyrosine phosphatase activity; hydrolase activity; protein kinase binding; phosphoprotein phosphatase activity; chaperone binding
Cellular component	cytoplasm; cytosol; intracellular anatomical structure; nucleoplasm; nucleus
Biological process	regulation of cyclin-dependent protein serine/threonine kinase activity; cellular response to UV; protein dephosphorylation; regulation of cell cycle; cell division; G2/M transition of mitotic cell cycle; cell cycle; response to radiation; peptidyl-tyrosine dephosphorylation; cell population proliferation; protein deubiquitination; positive regulation of cell cycle G2/M phase transition; G1/S transition of mitotic cell cycle; positive regulation of G2/M transition of mitotic cell cycle; positive regulation of mitotic cell cycle; positive regulation of G2/MI transition of meiotic cell cycle
Sources:Amigo / QuickGO
Orthologs
Databases	NCBI: entry; OMA: entry
Species	Human	Mouse
Entrez	993	12530
Ensembl	ENSG00000164045	ENSMUSG00000032477
UniProt	P30304	P48964
RefSeq (mRNA)	NM_001789; NM_201567	NM_007658
RefSeq (protein)	NP_001780; NP_963861	NP_031684
Location (UCSC)	Chr 3: 48.16 – 48.19 Mb	Chr 9: 109.7 – 109.72 Mb
PubMed search
- Wikidata
View/Edit Human	View/Edit Mouse

M-phase inducer phosphatase 1 also known as dual specificity phosphatase Cdc25A is a protein that in humans is encoded by the cell division cycle 25A (CDC25A) gene.

== Function ==
CDC25A is a member of the CDC25 family of dual-specificity phosphatases.

Dual-specificity protein phosphatases remove phosphate groups from phosphorylated tyrosine and serine / threonine residues. They represent a subgroup of the tyrosine phosphatase family (as opposed to the serine/threonine phosphatase family).

All mammals examined to date have three homologues of the ancestral Cdc25 gene (found e.g. in the fungus species S. pombe), designated Cdc25A, Cdc25B, and Cdc25C. In contrast, some invertebrates harbour two (e.g., the Drosophila proteins String and Twine) or four (e.g., C. elegans Cdc-25.1 - Cdc-25.4) homologues. CDC25A is required for progression from G1 to the S phase of the cell cycle, but also plays roles in later cell cycle events. In particular, it is stabilized in metaphase cells and is degraded upon metaphase exit akin to Cyclin B. It is competent to activate the G1/S cyclin-dependent kinases CDK4 and CDK2 by removing inhibitory phosphate groups from adjacent tyrosine and threonine residues; it can also activate Cdc2 (Cdk1), the principal mitotic Cdk.

== Involvement in cancer ==
CDC25A is specifically degraded in response to DNA damage, resulting in cell cycle arrest. Thus, this degradation represents one axis of a DNA damage checkpoint, complementing induction of p53 and p21 in the inhibition of CDKs. CDC25A is considered an oncogene, as it can cooperate with oncogenic RAS to transform rodent fibroblasts, and it is overexpressed in tumours from a variety of tissues, including breast and head & neck tumours. It is a target of the E2F family of transcription factors. Therefore, its overexpression is a common consequence of dysregulation of the p53-p21-Cdk axis in carcinogenesis.

== Interactions ==
CDC25A has been shown to interact with:

- ASK1,
- C-Raf,
- CHEK1,
- CCNE1,
- EGFR,
- PIM1 and
- YWHAB.
