= Embryonic diapause =

Evolutionary reproductive strategy of mammals

Embryonic diapause (Note: Diapause, from late 19th century English: dia- 'through' + pause- 'delay'.) (delayed implantation in mammals) is a reproductive strategy used by a number of animal species across different biological classes. In more than 130 types of mammals where this takes place, the process occurs at the blastocyst stage of embryonic development, and is characterized by a dramatic reduction or complete cessation of mitotic activity, arresting most often in the G_{0} or G_{1} phase of division.

In placental embryonic diapause, the blastocyst does not immediately implant in the uterus after sexual reproduction has resulted in the zygote, but rather remains in this non-dividing state of dormancy until conditions allow for attachment to the uterine wall to proceed as normal. As a result, the normal gestation period is extended for a species-specific time.

Diapause provides a survival advantage to offspring, because birth or emergence of young can be timed to coincide with the most hospitable conditions, regardless of when mating occurs or length of gestation; any such gain in survival rates of progeny confers an evolutionary advantage.

== Evolutionary significance ==
Organisms which undergo embryonic diapause are able to synchronize the birth of offspring to the most favorable conditions for reproductive success, irrespective of when mating took place. Many different factors can induce embryonic diapause, such as the time of year, temperature, lactation and supply of food.

Embryonic diapause is a relatively widespread phenomenon outside of mammals, with known occurrence in the reproductive cycles of many insects, nematodes, fish, and other non-mammalian vertebrates. It has been observed in approximately 130 mammalian species, which is less than two percent of all species of mammals. These include certain pinnipeds, rodents, bears, armadillos, mustelids (e.g. weasels and badgers), and marsupials (e.g. kangaroos). Some groups only have one species that undergoes embryonic diapause, such as the roe deer in the order Artiodactyla.

Experimental induction of embryonic discontinuous development within species which do not spontaneously undergo embryonic diapause in nature has been achieved; reversible developmental arrest was successfully demonstrated. This may be evidence for the evolutionary significance of this phenomenon, with latent capacity for diapause potentially present in a much wider segment of species than known to occur naturally.

== General mechanism ==
Organisms which can stop their cellular division (embryonic diapause) can prevent an embryo from growing. Non-ideal reproductive conditions are what initiate this process, as delaying embryo maturation promotes survival of offspring and the parent.

Placental embryonic diapause in particular is an essential component of developmental progression in these species. This cessation is led by the intentional failure of the blastocyst to implant the uterine wall. Hormones relating to the failed implantation also contribute to the embryonic arrest. Once the embryo exits diapause arrest and resumes regular development, no adverse effects have been observed.

Regulation of the cell cycle as it relates to embryonic diapause has been linked to the dacapo gene in the fruit fly. This gene inhibits the formation of Cyclin E/Cdk2 complexes, which is necessary for DNA synthesis. Another known regulator of the cell cycle, the B cell translocation gene 1 BTG1, has shown upregulation in mouse embryos during diapause, responsible for inhibiting transition from G_{0}/G_{1} (G0 phase, G1 phase). Inversely, other studies have demonstrated that common regulators of the cell cycle lack involvement, such as P53, within the placental model of embryonic diapause. While molecular regulation that activates dormant blastocysts has been characterized, little is known regarding entry into diapause, as well as any conditions that enable a blastocyst to remain dormant.

== Types ==
There are two distinct forms of embryonic diapause, characterized by different conditions of onset. Facultative diapause occurs in response to certain environmental or metabolic stressors, such as drastic changes in temperature, feeding, or lactation. Obligate diapause occurs regularly in the reproductive cycle of the affected species, and is often associated with seasonal changes and photo-period.

=== Facultative diapause ===
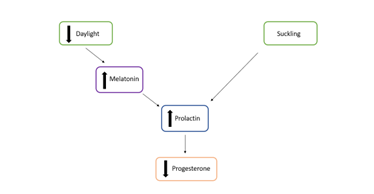
Mechanism of facultative embryonic diapause

Facultative diapause is regulated by several factors, including the maternal environment and ovarian competency, the pituitary gland, and metabolic stress and lactation.

With regards to the many other regulators of this form of diapause, in placental mammals, facultative diapause is most often the result of fertilization shortly following the birth of a previous litter, the consequential pups suckling during lactation promotes prolactin to be released. This in turn reduces progesterone secretion from the corpus luteum in a pregnant female. The corpus luteum is a temporary endocrine organ that is formed from the leftover cells from the ovarian follicle in the ovary, once it has released a mature ovum. The main function of the corpus luteum is to secrete progesterone during pregnancy in order to maintain the uterine environment needed. Prolactin acting on the corpus luteum causes the progesterone level to be below optimal concentration and therefore induces embryonic facultative diapause.

Each species that undergoes facultative diapause tends to have a specific developmental stage, that is genetically determined, in which this process is initiated. This form of diapause is most well studied in rodents and marsupials but has been identified in many other species, including non-mammals. It is not clear how well the mechanisms studied for the onset, maintenance and release from facultative diapause in the rodent model apply to these other species.

=== Obligate diapause ===
Obligate (adj: by necessity) diapause (a.k.a. seasonal delayed implantation) is a mechanism ensuring the birth of offspring is timed during optimal environmental conditions, to ensure maximal survival. The proposed mechanism is to separate conception and parturition (birth) so that each can occur at the most favourable time of year.

Obligate diapause is activated and deactivated by changes to the number of daylight hours within a day (photoperiod) and hence, occurs within specific seasons. While obligate diapause occurs in a variety of species in different groups, there are significant variations in diapause length. Western spotted skunks (Spilogale gracilis) have a diapause of around 200 days while American minks (Neogale vison) only have a diapause of around fourteen days.

Similarly to facultative diapause, a series of hormonal changes arrest the blastocyst development, prior to implantation, preventing continued growth of the embryo. However, in obligate diapause, the blastocyst shall enter into the dormant state in every reproductive season. This means every blastocyst a mother produces shall enter a period of diapause.

Close regulation of obligate diapause is essential for survival of the mother and offspring. Premature diapause can result in forgone growth and breeding opportunities and late diapause can result in death due to adverse conditions.

Prior to the vernal equinox, (Note: The vernal equinox is the March equinox in the Northern Hemisphere, and the September equinox in the Southern Hemisphere.) the photoperiod is less than 12 hours. This increases the production of melatonin in the pineal gland. Due to the inhibitory relationship between melatonin and prolactin, this increase in melatonin decreases prolactin secretion from the pituitary gland. The decrease in prolactin consequently decreases progesterone production in the corpus luteum, preventing development of the blastocyst. This induces embryonic diapause.

After the vernal equinox, the photoperiod is greater than 12 hours. This decreases the production of melatonin in the pineal gland and, therefore, increases the prolactin and progesterone production in the pituitary gland and corpus luteum respectively.

The increase in prolactin induces expression of the gene Odc (ornithine decarboxylase). The Odc gene produces the ODC protein, a rate-limiting enzyme in the production of the polyamine, putrescine, within the uterine environment. The presence of putrescine may indicate a role in inducing the escape of the embryo from obligate diapause.

== Embryonic stem cells ==
Embryonic stem cells (ESCs) have the potential to allow for further understanding of the mechanisms controlling embryonic diapause. This is because the ESCs and diapausing blastocysts having very similar transcriptome profiles. ESCs are derived from the undifferentiated inner mass cells of blastocysts of an embryo – with the capability of continual proliferation in vitro. ESCs are mostly derived from mouse models, at the point where the ESCs are at optimal efficiency and are able to enter diapause.

Both diapausing blastocysts and ESCs have transcriptome profile similarities, including downregulation of metabolism, biosynthesis and gene expression pathways. These similarities allow for the potential to use ESCs as a cellular model to identify the molecular factors which regulate embryonic diapause.

== See also ==
- Weddell seal#Breeding
