= Cyclin E1 =

Protein-coding gene in the species Homo sapiens

CCNE1
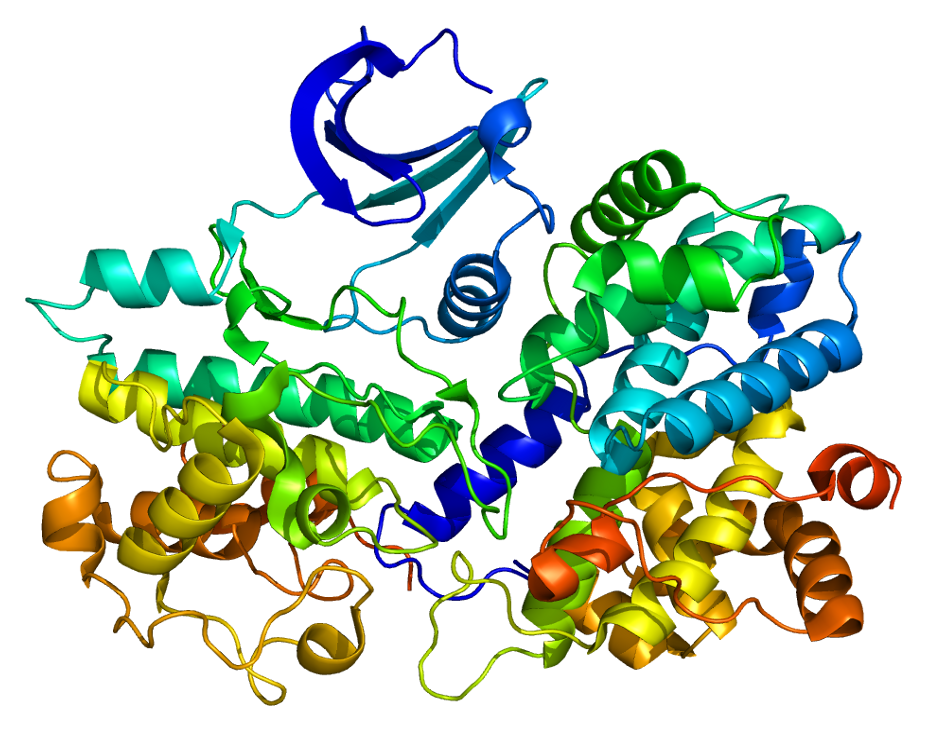

Identifiers
- Aliases: CCNE1, CCNE, pcyclin E1
- External IDs: OMIM: 123837; MGI: 88316; GeneCards: CCNE1
Available structures
PDB	Ortholog search: PDBe RCSB
PDB	List of PDB id codes 1W98

Gene location (Human)
Chr.	Chromosome 19 (human)
Band	19q12	Start	29,811,991 bp
Band	19q12	End	29,824,312 bp

Gene location (Mouse)
Chr.	Chromosome 7 (mouse)
Band	7 B3|7 25.35 cM	Start	37,797,409 bp
Band	7 B3|7 25.35 cM	End	37,806,959 bp
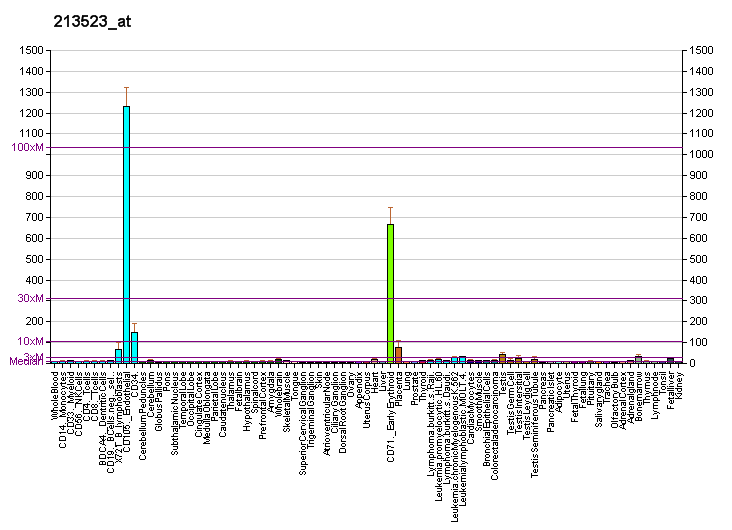
RNA expression pattern
Bgee	Human / Mouse (ortholog); Top expressed in: secondary oocyte; placenta; testicle; decidua; bone marrow; left testis; right testis; amniotic fluid; gingival epithelium; mucosa of transverse colon / Top expressed in: embryo; epiblast; morula; condyle; fossa; internal carotid artery; fetal liver hematopoietic progenitor cell; primitive streak; embryo; mandibular prominence; More reference expression data
BioGPS	More reference expression data
Gene ontology
Molecular function	transcription coactivator activity; kinase activity; cyclin-dependent protein serine/threonine kinase regulator activity; protein binding; androgen receptor binding; protein kinase binding; cyclin-dependent protein serine/threonine kinase activity; protein kinase activity
Cellular component	cytosol; cyclin-dependent protein kinase holoenzyme complex; nucleoplasm; nucleus; cyclin E1-CDK2 complex; cytoplasm; centrosome
Biological process	androgen receptor signaling pathway; Wnt signaling pathway; regulation of transcription involved in G1/S transition of mitotic cell cycle; regulation of cell cycle; cell division; positive regulation of transcription, DNA-templated; protein phosphorylation; DNA replication initiation; cell cycle; regulation of protein kinase activity; negative regulation of transcription by RNA polymerase II; telomere maintenance; homologous chromosome pairing at meiosis; chromosome organization involved in meiotic cell cycle; G1/S transition of mitotic cell cycle; regulation of cyclin-dependent protein serine/threonine kinase activity; mitotic cell cycle; regulation of mitotic nuclear division; positive regulation of cell population proliferation; positive regulation of cell cycle; positive regulation of G1/S transition of mitotic cell cycle; mitotic cell cycle phase transition
Sources:Amigo / QuickGO
Orthologs
Databases	NCBI: entry; OMA: entry
Species	Human	Mouse
Entrez	898	12447
Ensembl	ENSG00000105173	ENSMUSG00000002068
UniProt	P24864	Q61457
RefSeq (mRNA)	NM_001238; NM_057182; NM_001322259; NM_001322261; NM_001322262	NM_007633
RefSeq (protein)	NP_001229; NP_001309188; NP_001309190; NP_001309191; NP_001309188.1 NP_001309190.1	NP_031659
Location (UCSC)	Chr 19: 29.81 – 29.82 Mb	Chr 7: 37.8 – 37.81 Mb
PubMed search
- Wikidata
View/Edit Human	View/Edit Mouse

G1/S-specific cyclin-E1 is a protein that in humans is encoded by the CCNE1 gene.

== Function ==
The protein encoded by this gene belongs to the highly conserved cyclin family, whose members are characterized by a dramatic periodicity in protein abundance through the cell cycle. Cyclins function as regulators of CDK. Different cyclins exhibit distinct expression and degradation patterns which contribute to the temporal coordination of each mitotic event. This cyclin forms a complex with and functions as a regulatory subunit of CDK2, whose activity is required for cell cycle G1/S transition. This protein accumulates at the G1-S phase boundary and is degraded as cells progress through S phase. Overexpression of this gene has been observed in many tumors, which results in chromosome instability, and thus may contribute to tumorigenesis. This protein was found to associate with, and be involved in, the phosphorylation of NPAT protein (nuclear protein mapped to the ATM locus), which participates in cell-cycle regulated histone gene expression and plays a critical role in promoting cell-cycle progression in the absence of pRB. Two alternatively spliced transcript variants of this gene, which encode distinct isoforms, have been described. Two additional splice variants were reported but detailed nucleotide sequence information is not yet available.

== Interactions ==
Cyclin E1 has been shown to interact with:

- CDC25A,
- CDKN1B,
- CUL3
- Cdk1,
- Cyclin-dependent kinase 2,
- HERC5,
- P21,
- Retinoblastoma-like protein 2, and
- SMARCA4.

== See also ==
- Cyclin E
- Cyclin E/Cdk2
