= Mir-624 microRNA precursor family =

mir-624

Identifiers
- Symbol: mir-624
- Rfam: RF01007
- miRBase family: MIPF0000523

Other data
- RNA type: microRNA
- Domain(s): Eukaryota
- PDB structures: PDBe

mir-624 microRNA is a short non-coding RNA molecule belonging both to the family of microRNAs and to that of small interfering RNAs (siRNAs). MicroRNAs function to regulate the expression levels of other genes by several mechanisms, whilst siRNAs are involved primarily with the RNA interference (RNAi) pathway. siRNAs have been linked through some members to the regulation of cancer cell growth, specifically in prostate adenocarcinoma.

== Upregulation in the WI-38 cell line ==
miR-624 has been found to be upregulated in the WI-38 cell line of human fibroblasts in growth arrest states; there was a 1.9 fold increase observed in both cell quiescence and senescence, and a further increased 2.1 fold increase with H_{2}O_{2}-premature senescence. It has additionally been found to target the (CASP3) gene responsible for encoding the protein caspase 3.

== See also ==
- MicroRNA
