= Cyclin E2 =

Protein

CCNE2

Identifiers
- Aliases: CCNE2, CYCE2, cyclin E2
- External IDs: OMIM: 603775; MGI: 1329034; GeneCards: CCNE2

Gene location (Human)
Chr.	Chromosome 8 (human)
Band	8q22.1	Start	94,879,770 bp
Band	8q22.1	End	94,896,678 bp

Gene location (Mouse)
Chr.	Chromosome 4 (mouse)
Band	4|4 A1	Start	11,191,351 bp
Band	4|4 A1	End	11,204,779 bp
RNA expression pattern
Bgee	Human / Mouse (ortholog); Top expressed in: corpus callosum; C1 segment; inferior ganglion of vagus nerve; bone marrow; ganglionic eminence; testicle; ventricular zone; gonad; bone marrow cell; subthalamic nucleus / Top expressed in: spermatocyte; primitive streak; human fetus; tail of embryo; genital tubercle; abdominal wall; yolk sac; medial ganglionic eminence; fetal liver hematopoietic progenitor cell; dermis; More reference expression data
BioGPS	n/a
Gene ontology
Molecular function	cyclin-dependent protein serine/threonine kinase regulator activity; protein binding; cyclin-dependent protein serine/threonine kinase activity; protein kinase binding; protein kinase activity
Cellular component	cytosol; nucleus; nucleoplasm; cyclin E2-CDK2 complex; cyclin-dependent protein kinase holoenzyme complex; cytoplasm; centrosome
Biological process	cell division; cell cycle; regulation of cyclin-dependent protein serine/threonine kinase activity; DNA replication initiation; regulation of cell cycle; telomere maintenance; homologous chromosome pairing at meiosis; chromosome organization involved in meiotic cell cycle; G1/S transition of mitotic cell cycle; mitotic cell cycle; protein phosphorylation; regulation of mitotic nuclear division; positive regulation of cell population proliferation; positive regulation of cell cycle
Sources:Amigo / QuickGO
Orthologs
Databases	NCBI: entry; OMA: entry
Species	Human	Mouse
Entrez	9134	12448
Ensembl	ENSG00000175305	ENSMUSG00000028212
UniProt	O96020	Q9Z238
RefSeq (mRNA)	NM_004702; NM_057735; NM_057749	NM_001037134; NM_001282943; NM_009830
RefSeq (protein)	NP_477097	NP_001032211; NP_001269872; NP_033960
Location (UCSC)	Chr 8: 94.88 – 94.9 Mb	Chr 4: 11.19 – 11.2 Mb
PubMed search
- Wikidata
View/Edit Human	View/Edit Mouse

Cyclin E2

Identifiers
- Symbol: CCNE2
- NCBI gene: 9134
- HGNC: 1590
- OMIM: 603775
- RefSeq: NM_057749
- UniProt: O96020

Other data
- Locus: Chr. 8 q22.1
Search for
- Structures: Swiss-model
- Domains: InterPro

Cyclin E2 is a protein that in humans is encoded by the CCNE2 gene. It is a G1 cyclin that binds Cdk2 and is inhibited by p27(Kip1) and p21(Cip1). It plays a role in the G1/S portion of the cell cycle and also has putative interactions with proteins CDKN1A, CDKN1B, and CDK3. Aberrant expression can lead to cancer.
