= Cyclin E/Cdk2 =

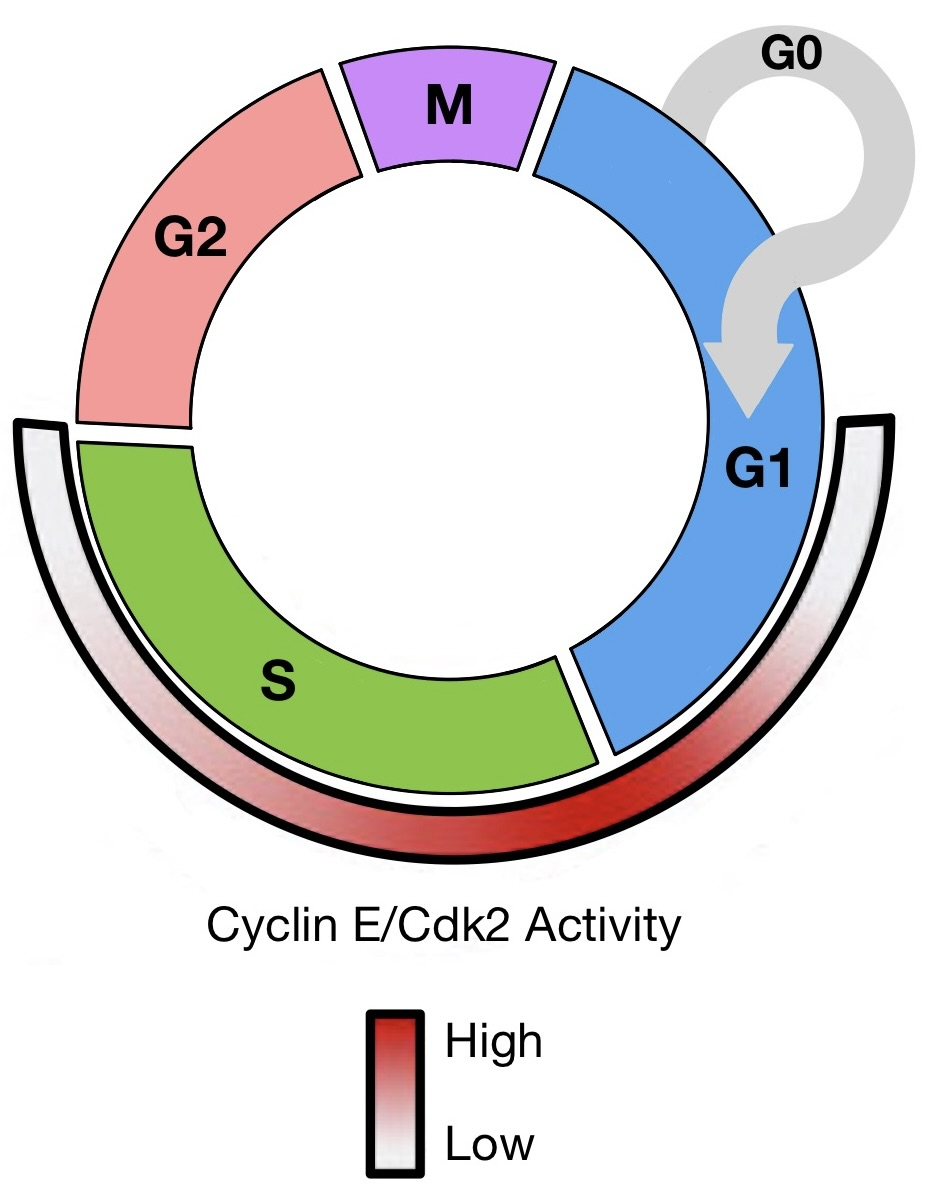
Cyclin E/Cdk2 activity levels throughout the cell cycle.

The Cyclin E/Cdk2 complex is a structure composed of two proteins, cyclin E and cyclin-dependent kinase 2 (Cdk2). Similar to other cyclin/Cdk complexes, the cyclin E/Cdk2 dimer plays a crucial role in regulating the cell cycle, with this specific complex peaking in activity during the G1/S transition. Once the cyclin and Cdk subunits join together, the complex gets activated, allowing it to phosphorylate and bind to downstream proteins to ultimately promote cell cycle progression. Although cyclin E can bind to other Cdk proteins, its primary binding partner is Cdk2, and the majority of cyclin E activity occurs when it exists as the cyclin E/Cdk2 complex.

== G1/S transition ==
Across eukaryotic cell types, the cell cycle is highly conserved, and the cyclin/Cdk complexes are consistently essential in driving the entire process forwards. Shortly before the end of G1 phase, cyclin E joins with Cdk2 to activate its serine-threonine kinase activity and thus promote entry into S phase.

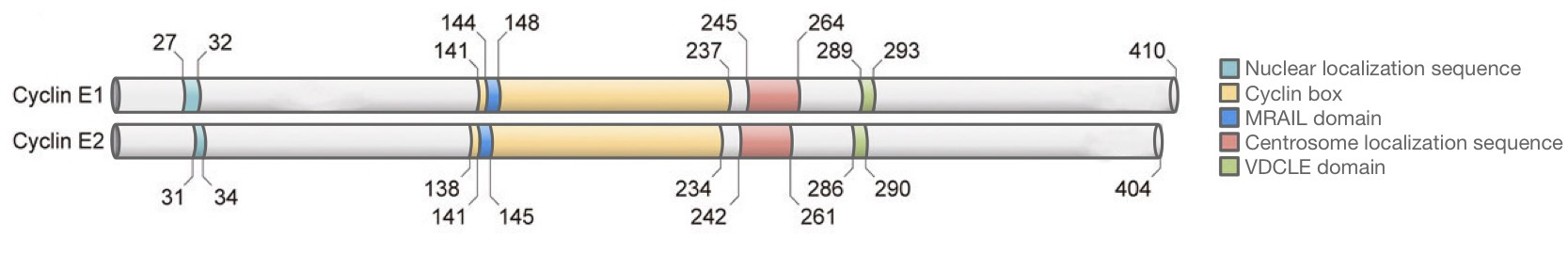
Cyclins E1 and E2 DNA domains.

Eukaryotic cells possess two types of cyclin, cyclin E1 and cyclin E2, with the protein sequences sharing 69.3% similarity in humans despite being encoded by two different genes. While there is significant overlap in function between the two cyclin Es, there are distinct differences in the roles and regulation of each cyclin E type. For example, in Xenopus laevis embryos only cyclin E1 is necessary for viability.

In living cells, over-expression (an excess amount) of either cyclin E type results in an earlier activation of the cyclin E/Cdk2 complex and the subsequent shortening of G1 phase and thus accelerated movement into S phase. The cyclin E/Cdk2 complex is not only important in regulating the G1/S transition, but in fact necessary and sufficient, as cells lacking functional cyclin E are unable to enter S phase, remaining forever arrested in G1.

=== Complex activation ===
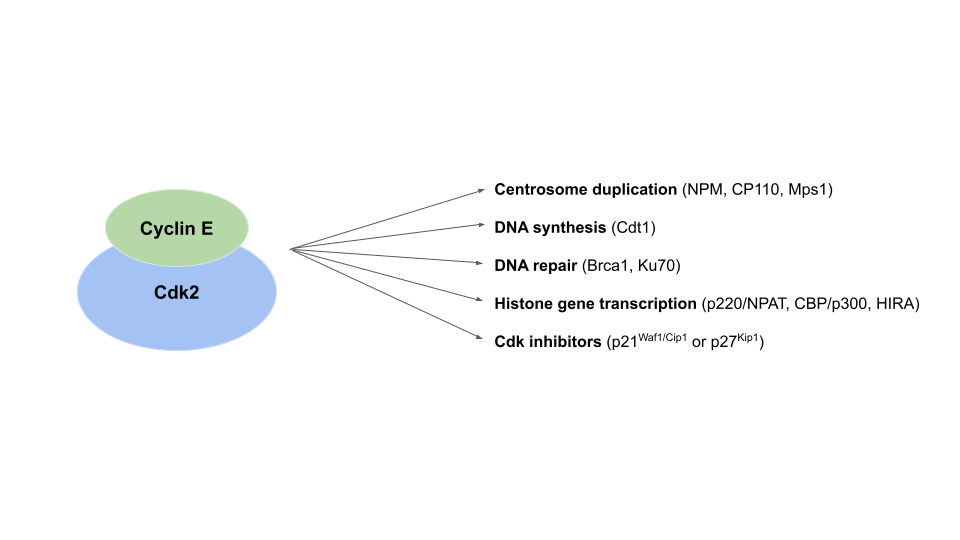
Functions of the cyclin E/Cdk2 complex and the proteins it phosphorylates.

The cyclin E protein contains a section called the cyclin box, which interacts with the PSTAIRE helix on Cdk2 to enact a conformational change in Cdk2's T loop. The resulting exposure of Cdk2's catalytic site enables Cdk activating kinase (CAK) to phosphorylate Cdk2, allowing full activation of the cyclin E/Cdk2 complex. Once the protein dimer is formed and activated, it phosphorylates several important proteins including "proteins involved in centrosome duplication (NPM, CP110, Mps1), DNA synthesis (Cdt1), DNA repair (Brca1, Ku70), histone gene transcription (p220/NPAT, CBP/p300, HIRA) and Cdk inhibitors p21^{Waf1/Cip1} or p27^{Kip1}." The complex interacts with its substrates due to two distinct regions of the cyclin E protein–the MRAIL and VDCLE domains. MRAIL is located at the N-terminus of cyclin E's cyclin box and interacts with proteins containing an RLX sequence (argininine-leucine-any amino acid) such as Rb, and p27^{KIP1}. VDCLE is located at cyclin E's C-terminal region and interacts with proteins of the retinoblastoma family including Rb1, p107, and p130.

=== Localization ===
Cyclin E is predominantly found in the cell nucleus, and although it shuttles between the nucleus and the cytoplasm, it typically appears as a nuclear protein in images as its nuclear import is more rapid than its export. Cyclin E's nuclear localization sequence (NLS) allows the cyclin E/Cdk2 complex to readily enter the nucleus, although other mechanisms are believed to help the complex localize to the region as well. Cyclin E also contains a centrosome localization sequence (CLS) that plays a key role in allowing the cyclin E/Cdk2 complex to control centrosome duplication during early S phase.

== Retinoblastoma protein ==
=== Background–phosphorylation ===
The retinoblastoma tumor suppressor protein (Rb) plays a key regulatory role in several cellular activities, such as the G1 restriction checkpoint, the DNA damage checkpoint, cell cycle exit, and cellular differentiation. As its full name suggests, cells containing mutations in pathways upstream of Rb or in the protein itself (however this case is more rare), are often cancerous. In fact, the majority of human cancer cells contain mutations in proteins responsible for phosphorylating Rb, such as deletions (p16) or over-expressions (cyclin D, Cdk4, Cdk6).

Within its structure, Rb contains 16 possible sites for phosphorylation by other proteins. Surprisingly, however, it exists in only 3 possible states: un-phosphorylated (no sites phosphorylated), mono-phosphorylated (one site phosphorylated), or hyper-phosphorylated (all available sites phosphorylated). In G0 phase, Rb exists solely in its un-phosphorylated form, but in early G1 phase, the Cyclin D:Cdk4/6 complex adds one phosphate group and the protein remains in its mono-phosphorylated form until late G1 when it is rapidly hyper-phosporylated by the Cyclin E/Cdk 2 complex.

=== Cell cycle progression ===
The key mechanism through which the cyclin E/Cdk2 complex is able to promote S phase progression is through Rb and E2F transcription factors. Transcription factors (TF) regulate the rate at which specific target genes are transcribed from DNA to RNA, i.e. transcription. At the end of G1, cells move through the restriction point–essentially "the point of no return" as cells that pass through are irreversibly committed to division and extracellular signals are no longer required for cell cycle progression. The rapid accumulation and activation of the cyclin E/Cdk 2 complex through positive feedback loops drives the cell forward through G1.

After phosphorylation by Cyclin D:Cdk4/6, mono-phosphorylated Rb binds to E2F family proteins, preventing their target genes from being transcribed; interestingly, one of the target genes is cyclin E. The rate-limiting switch-like step to initially activate the cyclin E/Cdk2 complex after Rb mono-phosphorylation is currently unknown, but it is hypothesized that the activation is regulated by an unidentified metabolic sensor, such that once the necessary metabolic threshold has been exceeded, the sensor activates Cyclin E/Cdk2. The metabolic sensor's activation of the cyclin E/Cdk2 complex initiates the process of Rb hyper-phosphorylation of Rb.

Mono-phosphorylated Rb inactivates E2F TFs, but hyper-phosphorylation of Rb results in Rb inactivation, causing the release of E2F proteins from the Rb binding cleft and consequent activation of the E2F family proteins to initiate transcription of their target genes. As a result, more cyclin E is transcribed and more cyclin E/Cdk2 complex is formed and activated. Thus, since cyclin E/Cdk2 activates its transcription factors, cyclin E/Cdk2 can facilitate its own activation, leading to a rapid accumulation of the complex and simultaneous rapid hyper-phosphorylation (i.e. inactivation) of Rb. The rapid inactivation of Rb causes a sudden switch-like transition through the late G1 restriction point (and into S phase). In summary, cyclin E/Cdk2's inactivation of Rb activates E2F which activates more cylin E (and thus the cyclin E/Cdk2 complex), creating a strong positive feedback loop that results in sudden inactivation of Rb and the irreversible push out of G1 and into S phase.
