= CDK2AP1 =

Protein-coding gene in humans

Identifiers
- Aliases: CDK2AP1, DOC1, DORC1, ST19, doc-1, p12DOC-1, cyclin-dependent kinase 2 associated protein 1, cyclin dependent kinase 2 associated protein 1
- External IDs: OMIM: 602198; MGI: 1202069; GeneCards: CDK2AP1
Available structures
| PDB | Ortholog search: PDBe RCSB |
| PDB | List of PDB id codes 2KW6 |

Gene location (Human)
| Chr. | Chromosome 12 (human) |
| Band | 12q24.31 | Start | 123,250,112 bp |
| Band | 12q24.31 | End | 123,272,334 bp |

Gene location (Mouse)
| Chr. | Chromosome 5 (mouse) |
| Band | 5|5 F | Start | 124,483,480 bp |
| Band | 5|5 F | End | 124,501,145 bp |
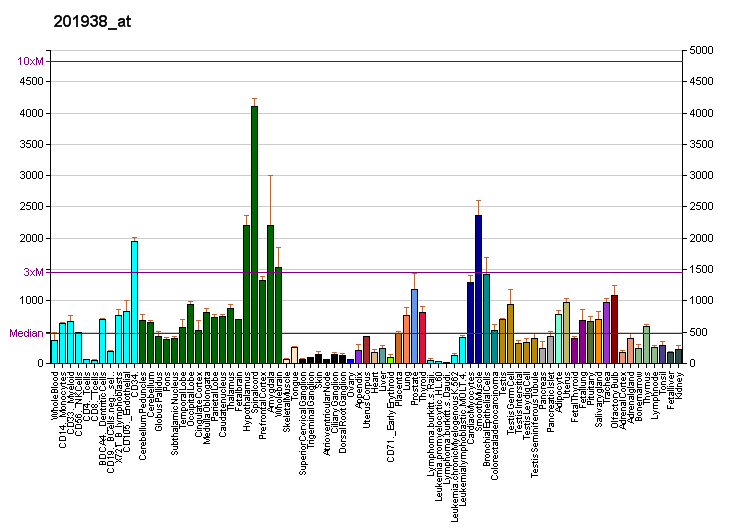
RNA expression pattern
| Bgee | Human / Mouse (ortholog); Top expressed in: parotid gland; tibia; spinal cord; C1 segment; ganglionic eminence; internal globus pallidus; superior vestibular nucleus; ventricular zone; inferior ganglion of vagus nerve; dorsal motor nucleus of vagus nerve / Top expressed in: genital tubercle; tail of embryo; ganglionic eminence; ventricular zone; epiblast; morula; islet of Langerhans; quadriceps femoris muscle; adrenal gland; lip; More reference expression data |
| BioGPS | More reference expression data |
Gene ontology
| Molecular function | protein binding; DNA polymerase binding |
| Cellular component | perinuclear region of cytoplasm; nucleus; nucleoplasm; cytosol |
| Biological process | DNA-dependent DNA replication; cell cycle; positive regulation of protein phosphorylation |
Sources:Amigo / QuickGO
Orthologs
| Databases | NCBI: entry; OMA: entry |
| Species | Human | Mouse |
| Entrez | 8099 | 13445 |
| Ensembl | ENSG00000111328 | ENSMUSG00000029394 |
| UniProt | O14519 | O35207 |
| RefSeq (mRNA) | NM_001270433; NM_001270434; NM_004642 | NM_013812 |
| RefSeq (protein) | NP_001257362; NP_001257363; NP_004633 | NP_038840 |
| Location (UCSC) | Chr 12: 123.25 – 123.27 Mb | Chr 5: 124.48 – 124.5 Mb |
| PubMed search |
- Wikidata
| View/Edit Human | View/Edit Mouse |

Cyclin-dependent kinase 2-associated protein 1 is an enzyme that in humans is encoded by the CDK2AP1 gene.

== Function ==
The protein encoded by this gene is a specific CDK2-associated protein, which is thought to negatively regulate CDK2 activity by sequestering monomeric CDK2, and targeting CDK2 for proteolysis. This protein was found to also interact with DNA polymerase alpha/primase and mediate the phosphorylation of the large p180 subunit, which suggested the regulatory role in DNA replication during S phase of the cell cycle. A similar gene in hamster was isolated from, and functions as a growth suppressor of normal keratinocytes.

== Interactions ==
CDK2AP1 has been shown to interact with Cyclin-dependent kinase 2.

It interacts with unnamed protein product (BC006130) which may mediate inhibitory effect of CDK2AP1 on cell proliferation.
