= Cyclin D/Cdk4 =

Multi-protein structure

The Cyclin D/Cdk4 complex is a multi-protein structure consisting of the proteins Cyclin D and cyclin-dependent kinase 4, or Cdk4, a serine-threonine kinase. This complex is one of many cyclin/cyclin-dependent kinase complexes that are the "hearts of the cell-cycle control system" and govern the cell cycle and its progression. As its name would suggest, the cyclin-dependent kinase is only active and able to phosphorylate its substrates when it is bound by the corresponding cyclin. The Cyclin D/Cdk4 complex is integral for the progression of the cell from the Growth 1 phase to the Synthesis phase of the cell cycle, for the Start or G1/S checkpoint.

== Basic Mechanism ==
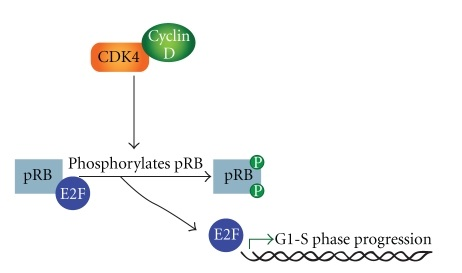
Role of CDK4, cyklin D, Rb and E2F in cell cycle regulation.

Under non-dividing conditions (when the cell is in the G0 phase of the cell cycle), Retinoblastoma protein (Rb) is bound with the E2F transcription factor. During the G0 to G1 transition, growth factor stimulates the synthesis of Cyclin D protein, whose concentration increases until it peaks around the G1/S transition.

In the early to middle stages of G1 phase, Cyclin D binds to the constitutively expressed Cdk4 protein, which creates an activated CyclinD/Cdk4 complex. Once activated, the Cyclin D/Cdk4 complex docks at a C-terminus helix on the Retinoblastoma protein (pRb), which is driven by a recognition site for the C-terminus helix on Cyclin D. Upon docking, CyclinD/Cdk4 mono-phosphorylates the Rb protein, which disrupts the Rb/E2F interaction and is sufficient to initiate E2F induction. E2F transcriptionally activates a number of downstream target genes required in the next stages of the cell cycle and in DNA replication by binding to their DNA promoter regions. These genes include the cyclin E and A genes, and other genes associated with the G1/S transition.

Synthesis of cyclin E and subsequent binding to constitutively expressed Cdk2 leads to a surge in activity of the cyclin E/Cdk2 complex, which is responsible for hyperphosphorylation of Rb. Rb hyperphosphorylation leads to the complete inactivation of Rb and release of E2F, initiating a positive feedback loop between E2F and cyclin E/Cdk2 that stimulates expression of E2F-driven G1/S transition genes, and, at a certain level, activates the bistable switch that drives irreversible progression into S phase.

== Regulation ==
There are multiple regulation points within this signaling pathway. First and foremost, under non-dividing conditions multiple proteins can inhibit the Cyclin D/Cdk4 complex by binding Cdk4 and inhibiting its association with Cyclin D. Primarily, this is accomplished by p27 but it can also be done by p16 and p21. However, this pathway is stimulated by the upstream binding of growth factors (GF), either from within the cell itself or from neighboring cells. Stimulation by growth factors activates any of a number of receptor tyrosine kinase (RTK) proteins. These receptor tyrosine kinases in turn phosphorylate and activate many other proteins, including Fos/Jun/Myc and phosphatidylinositol 3 kinase (PI-3-K). Fos/Jun/Myc helps to activate the Cyclin D/Cdk4 complex. Phosphatidylinositol 3 kinase phosphorylates p27 (or p16 or p21) and SCF/Skp1. The phosphorylation of p27 inhibits p27's ability to bind Cdk4, thus freeing Cdk4 to associate with Cyclin D and form an active complex. SCF/Skp1 (an E3 ubiquitin ligase) helps to further inhibit p27 and thus further help activate the Cyclin D/Cdk4 complex. Also, p27 acts as an inhibitor of Cyclin E and Cyclin A. So, its inhibition also facilitates the activation of downstream mitotic processes, as noted above.

There are also other peripheral regulators of the Cyclin D/Cdk4 complex. In megakaryocytes, it is regulated by the GATA-1 transcription factor. GATA-1 serves as an activating transcription factor of Cyclin D and potentially also as a repressor of the Cyclin D inhibitor, p16. Cdk4 also requires activation upon complex assembly with Cyclin D. This is accomplished by a Cdk activating kinase (CAK), which phosphorylates Cdk4 at threonine 172.

== Cancer ==
Disruptions in The CyclinD/Cdk4 Axis in Cancer

The function of the Cyclin D/Cdk4 complex suggests an obvious link to cancer and tumorigenesis. In fact, disruptions in the Cyclin D/Cdk4 axis that lead to increased Cyclin D/Cdk4 activity have been detected in many cancers. There are a number of drivers of these disruptions.

- First, tumors can overexpress Cyclin D1, as has been found in breast and pancreatic cancer.
- Second, tumors can have mutations or amplifications in the Cdk4 protein, as has been found in melanoma and squamous cell carcinoma of the head and neck.
- Third, tumors can experience reduction in or complete loss of negative regulators of Cyclin D/Cdk4, either by mutation, deletion, or downregulation of the inhibitors. Homozygous deletions in p16, an INK4-family inhibitor of Cdk4, have been found in over 50% of gliomas, and mutations in p16 have been found in numerous cancer types including familial melanomas; lymphomas; and esophageal, pancreatic, and non-small cell lung cancers. Decreased expression of p27, a CIP/KIP-family inhibitor, has been found in a number of colon, breast, prostate, liver, lung, bladder, ovary, and stomach cancers; it is an indicator of poorer prognosis in these cancers.
- Fourth, tumors can downregulate miRNAs that target Cdk4, as has been found in bladder cancer.
- Lastly, tumors can have dysregulation in upstream oncogenic signaling pathways like the phosphatidylinositol 3-kinase (P13K) pathway, the mitogen-activated protein kinase (MAPK) kinase, the nuclear factor kappa-light-chain-enhancer of activated B cells (NF-κB) pathway, and steroid hormone signaling pathways that promote CyclinD/Cdk4 activity.

Disruption of the Cyclin D/Cdk4 axis through any of these three mechanisms induces phosphorylation of Rb, transcription of E2F-driven genes, uncontrolled progression through the G1/S checkpoint, and ultimately cancer cell growth.

Selective Cdk4/6 Inhibitors

Given the role of Cyclin D/Cdk4 in cancer progression, the development of selective Cdk4/6 inhibitors has been of increased interest in recent years. Currently, three Cdk4/6 inhibitors have been approved or are in late-stage development: palbociclib, ribociclib, and abemaciclib. All three of these inhibitors are ATP-competitive, orally administered medications.

Thus far, selective Cdk4/6 inhibitors have shown the most promise when used in combination with other anti-estrogen therapies for the treatment of hormone-receptor-positive (HR+) advanced breast cancer. In HR+ breast cancer, cells retain wildtype Rb expression and have overexpressed Cyclin D1.

- Recent Stage III clinical trial results from the MONALEESA-2 study have indicated that ribociclib in combination with the nonsteroidal aromatase inhibitor letrozole increased median overall survival by 12.5 months in HR+, human epidermal growth factor receptor 2 (HER2)-negative postmenopausal breast cancer patients compared to treatment with letrozole alone.
- Results from the PALOMA-2 study showed that treatment with palbociclib and letrozole increased progression-free survival by 10.3 months compared to treatment with letrozole alone for patients with previously untreated HR+ positive, HER2-negative breast cancer.
- Results from the MONARCH-3 study have shown that treatment with abemaciclib in combination with letrozole or anastrozole increased median progression-free survival by 13.42 months for postmenopausal patients with untreated HR+, HER2-negative breast cancer.

Additional studies into the efficacy of these combination therapies on advanced breast cancer survival in different settings are ongoing. Based on the encouraging results from the clinical trials, additional studies are also underway to investigate the effect of the three selective Cdk4/6 inhibitors on other neoplasms like non-small cell lung cancer. Of note, some patients in pre-clinical and clinical settings have not responded to the Cdk4/6 inhibitors or have become resistant to them. Research into the mechanisms behind these clinical outcomes is still in progress.

== Non-Canonical Roles of CyclinD/Cdk4 ==
In addition to its canonical role in promoting progression through the cell cycle, CyclinD/Cdk4 also plays a role in regulating cell differentiation and metabolism in a variety of contexts.

Cell Differentiation

Rb can promote cell cycle differentiation by interacting with multiple different cell-type-specific transcription factors. These transcription factors include MyoD and MEF2, which regulate muscle cell differentiation, and RUNX2, which regulates osteoblast differentiation. When CyclinD/Cdk4 phosphorylates and inactivates Rb, Rb’s role in driving cell differentiation via interaction with these transcription factors is inhibited. Cyclin D/Cdk4 activity can also directly block the association of MEF2 with GRIP-1, a transcription co-activator, which inhibits MEF2’s ability to induce muscle gene expression and subsequent differentiation.

Cyclin D/Cdk4 activity can also regulate cell differentiation through Rb-independent pathways. For instance, CyclinD/Cdk4 activity has been shown to phosphorylate the transcription factor GATA4, which targets it for degradation and inhibits differentiation of cardiomyocytes. Additionally, Cyclin D/Cdk4 activity is thought to block neurogenesis in neural stem cells and promote the expansion of basal progenitors.

Metabolism

Gluconeogenesis in the liver is critical for survival during times of fasting and starvation. CyclinD1/Cdk4 activity has been shown to play a role in regulating glucose homeostasis by suppressing hepatic gluconeogenesis via phosphorylation-induced inhibition of the peroxisome proliferator-activated receptor γ coactivator-1α (PGC1α). (PGC1α) is a transcriptional coactivator that drives the gene expression programming for gluconeogenesis in the liver. Additional research has shown that the CyclinD/Cdk4/Rb/ER2F pathway also influences the expression of Kir6.2, a subunit of the ATP-sensitive K channel that regulates glucose-induced insulin secretion. When the CyclinD/Cdk4 complex is inhibited, Kir6.2 expression is downregulated, and there is impaired insulin secretion and glucose intolerance when tested in mouse models. Given that glucose homeostasis is dysregulated in diabetes, there is ongoing interest in whether the CyclinD/Cdk4 complex could be a potential target for disease treatment.

== See also ==
- Human papillomavirus
