= Cyclin E =

Member of the cyclin family

cyclin E1

Identifiers
- Symbol: CCNE1
- Alt. symbols: CCNE
- NCBI gene: 898
- HGNC: 1589
- OMIM: 123837
- RefSeq: NM_001238
- UniProt: P24864

Other data
- Locus: Chr. 19 q12
Search for
- Structures: Swiss-model
- Domains: InterPro

cyclin E2

Identifiers
- Symbol: CCNE2
- NCBI gene: 9134
- HGNC: 1590
- OMIM: 603775
- RefSeq: NM_057749
- UniProt: O96020

Other data
- Locus: Chr. 8 q22.1
Search for
- Structures: Swiss-model
- Domains: InterPro

Cyclin E is a member of the cyclin family.

Cyclin E binds to G_{1} phase Cdk2, which is required for the transition from G_{1} to S phase of the cell cycle that determines initiation of DNA duplication. The Cyclin E/CDK2 complex phosphorylates p27^{Kip1} (an inhibitor of Cyclin D), tagging it for degradation, thus promoting expression of Cyclin A, allowing progression to S phase.

Expression of cyclins through the cell cycle.

== Functions of Cyclin E ==
Like all cyclin family members, cyclin E forms complexes with cyclin-dependent kinases. In particular, Cyclin E binds with CDK2. Cyclin E/CDK2 regulates multiple cellular processes by phosphorylating numerous downstream proteins.

Cyclin E/CDK2 plays a critical role in the G1 phase and in the G1-S phase transition. Cyclin E/CDK2 phosphorylates retinoblastoma protein (Rb) to promote G1 progression. Hyper-phosphorylated Rb will no longer interact with E2F transcriptional factor, thus release it to promote expression of genes that drive cells to S phase through G1 phase. Cyclin E/CDK2 also phosphorylates p27 and p21 during G1 and S phases, respectively. Smad3, a key mediator of TGF-β pathway which inhibits cell cycle progression, can be phosphorylated by cyclin E/CDK2. The phosphorylation of Smad3 by cyclin E/CDK2 inhibits its transcriptional activity and ultimately facilitates cell cycle progression. CBP/p300 and E2F-5 are also substrates of cyclin E/CDK2. Phosphorylation of these two proteins stimulates the transcriptional events during cell cycle progression. Cyclin E/CDK2 can phosphorylate p220(NPAT) to promote histone gene transcription during cell cycle progression.

Apart from the function in cell cycle progression, cyclin E/CDK2 plays a role in the centrosome cycle. This function is performed by phosphorylating nucleophosmin (NPM). Then NPM is released from binding to an unduplicated centrosome, thereby triggering duplication. CP110 is another cyclin E/CDK2 substrate which involves in centriole duplication and centrosome separation. Cyclin E/CDK2 has also been shown to regulate the apoptotic response to DNA damage via phosphorylation of FOXO1.

== Cyclin E and Cancer ==
Over-expression of cyclin E correlates with tumorigenesis. It is involved in various types of cancers, including breast, colon, bladder, skin and lung cancer. DNA copy-number amplification of cyclin E1 is involved in brain cancer. Besides that, dysregulated cyclin E activity causes cell lineage-specific abnormalities, such as impaired maturation due to increased cell proliferation and apoptosis or senescence.

Several mechanisms lead to the deregulated expression of cyclin E. In most cases, gene amplification causes the overexpression. Proteosome caused defected degradation is another mechanism. Loss-of-function mutations of FBXW7 were found in several cancer cells. FBXW7 encodes F-box proteins which target cyclin E for ubiquitination. Cyclin E overexpression can lead to G1 shortening, decrease in cell size or loss of serum requirement for proliferation.

Dysregulation of cyclin E occurs in 18-22% of the breast cancers. Cyclin E is a prognostic marker in breast cancer, its altered expression increased with the increasing stage and grade of the tumor. Low molecular weight cyclin E isoforms have been shown to be of great pathogenetic and prognostic importance for breast cancer. These isoforms are resistant to CKIs, bind with CDK2 more efficiently and can stimulate the cell cycle progression more efficiently. They are proved to be a remarkable marker of the prognosis of early-stage-node negative breast cancer. Importantly, a recent research pointed out cyclin E overexpression is a mechanism of Trastuzumab resistance in HER2+ breast cancer patients. Thus, co-treatment of trastuzumab with CDK2 inhibitors may be a valid strategy.

Cyclin E overexpression is implicated in carcinomas at various sites along the gastrointestinal tract. Among these carcinomas, cyclin E appears to be more important in stomach and colon cancer. Cyclin E overexpression was found in 50-60% of gastric adenomas and adenocarcinomas. In ~10% of colorectal carcinomas, cyclin E gene amplification is found, sometimes together with CDK2 gene amplification.

Cyclin E is also a useful prognostic marker for lung cancer. There is significant association between cyclin E over-expression and the prognosis of lung cancer. It is believed increased expression of cyclin E correlated with poorer prognosis.
