= Cyclin-dependent kinase 3 =

Protein-coding gene in the species Homo sapiens

CDK3

Identifiers
- Aliases: CDK3, cyclin dependent kinase 3
- External IDs: OMIM: 123828; GeneCards: CDK3
Available structures
PDB	Human UniProt search: PDBe RCSB
PDB	List of PDB id codes 1LFN
Enzyme activity
EC #	BRENDA	ExPASy	KEGG	MetaCyc
2.7.11.22	↗	↗	↗	↗

Gene location (Human)
Chr.	Chromosome 17 (human)
Band	17q25.1	Start	76,000,855 bp
Band	17q25.1	End	76,005,999 bp
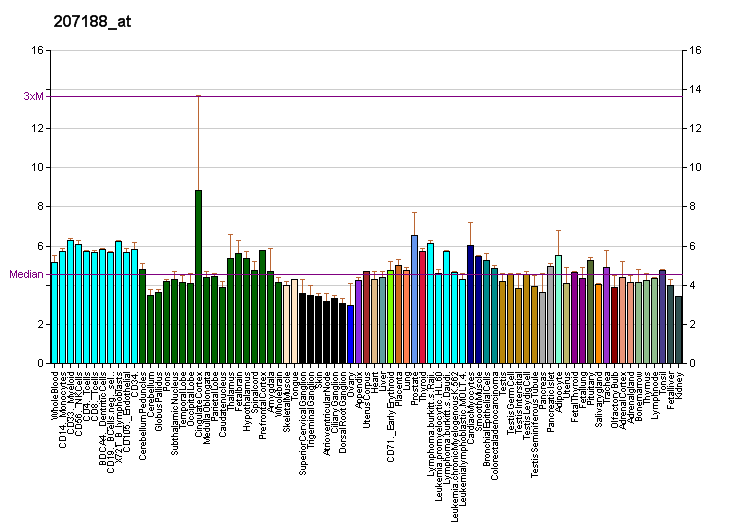

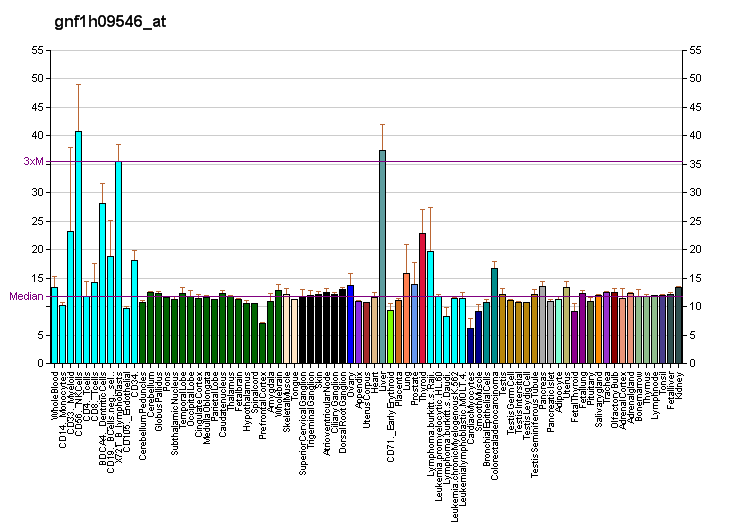
RNA expression pattern
Bgee	Human / Mouse (ortholog); Top expressed in: mucosa of transverse colon; right lobe of liver; granulocyte; pituitary gland; right lobe of thyroid gland; right uterine tube; anterior pituitary; gonad; prostate; spleen / n/a; More reference expression data
BioGPS	More reference expression data
Gene ontology
Molecular function	protein serine/threonine kinase activity; ATP binding; kinase activity; nucleotide binding; protein kinase activity; transferase activity; cyclin-dependent protein serine/threonine kinase activity; protein binding; cyclin binding
Cellular component	cyclin-dependent protein kinase holoenzyme complex; nucleus; cytoplasm
Biological process	cell division; cell population proliferation; cell cycle; G0 to G1 transition; cellular response to DNA damage stimulus; phosphorylation; protein phosphorylation; signal transduction; multicellular organism development; positive regulation of cell population proliferation; response to organic substance; regulation of G2/M transition of mitotic cell cycle; regulation of gene expression; G1/S transition of mitotic cell cycle; regulation of cell cycle
Sources:Amigo / QuickGO
Orthologs
Databases	NCBI: entry; OMA: entry
Species	Human	Mouse
Entrez	1018	n/a
Ensembl	ENSG00000250506	n/a
UniProt	Q00526	n/a
RefSeq (mRNA)	NM_001258	n/a
RefSeq (protein)	NP_001249	n/a
Location (UCSC)	Chr 17: 76 – 76.01 Mb	n/a
PubMed search		n/a
- Wikidata
View/Edit Human

Cell division protein kinase 3 is an enzyme that in humans is encoded by the CDK3 gene.

== Function ==
CDK3 complements cdc28 mutants of Saccharomyces cerevisiae suggesting that it may be involved in cell cycle control. CDK3 can phosphorylate histone H1 and interacts with an unknown type of cyclin.
