= Cyclin-dependent kinase 2 =

Protein found in humans

CDK2
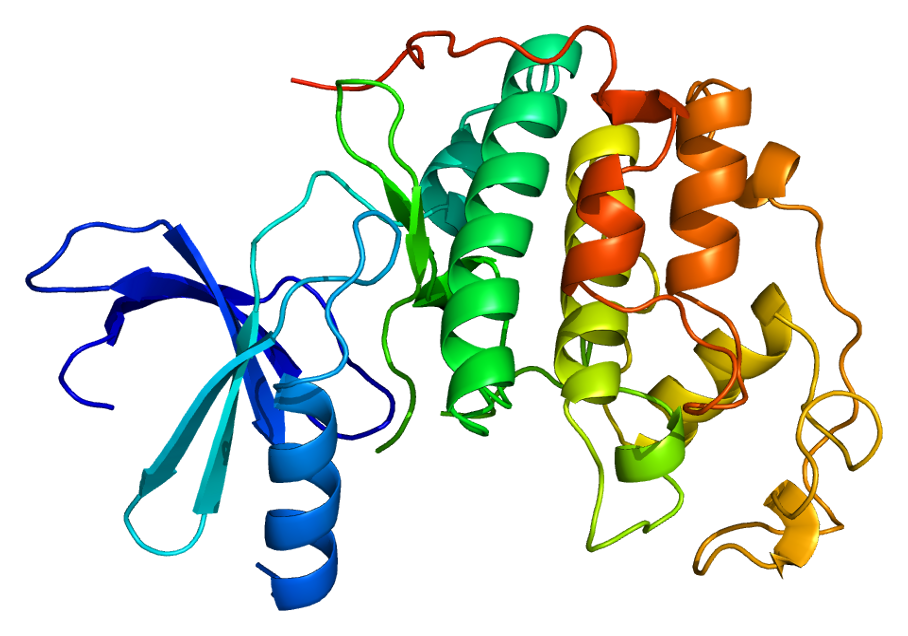

Identifiers
- Aliases: CDK2, cyclin-dependent kinase 2, A630093N05Rik, CDKN2, p33(CDK2), cyclin dependent kinase 2
- External IDs: OMIM: 116953; MGI: 104772; GeneCards: CDK2
Available structures
PDB	Ortholog search: PDBe RCSB
PDB	List of PDB id codes 1AQ1, 1B38, 1B39, 1BUH, 1CKP, 1DI8, 1DM2, 1E1V, 1E1X, 1E9H, 1F5Q, 1FIN, 1FQ1, 1FVT, 1FVV, 1G5S, 1GIH, 1GII, 1GIJ, 1GY3, 1GZ8, 1H00, 1H01, 1H07, 1H08, 1H0V, 1H0W, 1H1P, 1H1Q, 1H1R, 1H1S, 1H24, 1H25, 1H26, 1H27, 1H28, 1HCK, 1HCL, 1JST, 1JSU, 1JSV, 1JVP, 1KE5, 1KE6, 1KE7, 1KE8, 1KE9, 1OGU, 1OI9, 1OIQ, 1OIR, 1OIT, 1OIU, 1OIY, 1OKV, 1OKW, 1OL1, 1OL2, 1P2A, 1P5E, 1PF8, 1PKD, 1PW2, 1PXI, 1PXJ, 1PXK, 1PXL, 1PXM, 1PXN, 1PXO, 1PXP, 1PYE, 1QMZ, 1R78, 1URC, 1URW, 1V1K, 1VYW, 1VYZ, 1W0X, 1W8C, 1W98, 1WCC, 1Y8Y, 1Y91, 1YKR, 2A0C, 2A4L, 2B52, 2B53, 2B54, 2B55, 2BHE, 2BHH, 2BKZ, 2BPM, 2BTR, 2BTS, 2C4G, 2C5N, 2C5O, 2C5V, 2C5X, 2C5Y, 2C68, 2C69, 2C6I, 2C6K, 2C6L, 2C6M, 2C6O, 2C6T, 2CCH, 2CCI, 2CJM, 2CLX, 2DS1, 2DUV, 2EXM, 2FVD, 2G9X, 2I40, 2IW6, 2IW8, 2IW9, 2J9M, 2JGZ, 2R3F, 2R3G, 2R3H, 2R3I, 2R3J, 2R3K, 2R3L, 2R3M, 2R3N, 2R3O, 2R3P, 2R3Q, 2R3R, 2R64, 2UUE, 2UZB, 2UZD, 2UZE, 2UZL, 2UZN, 2UZO, 2V0D, 2V22, 2VTA, 2VTH, 2VTI, 2VTJ, 2VTL, 2VTM, 2VTN, 2VTO, 2VTP, 2VTQ, 2VTR, 2VTS, 2VTT, 2VU3, 2VV9, 2W05, 2W06, 2W17, 2W1H, 2WEV, 2WFY, 2WHB, 2WIH, 2WIP, 2WMA, 2WMB, 2WPA, 2WXV, 2X1N, 2XMY, 2XNB, 3BHT, 3BHU, 3BHV, 3DDP, 3DDQ, 3DOG, 3EID, 3EJ1, 3EOC, 3EZR, 3EZV, 3F5X, 3FZ1, 3IG7, 3IGG, 3LE6, 3LFN, 3LFQ, 3LFS, 3MY5, 3NS9, 3PJ8, 3PXF, 3PXQ, 3PXR, 3PXY, 3PXZ, 3PY0, 3PY1, 3QHR, 3QHW, 3QL8, 3QQF, 3QQG, 3QQH, 3QQJ, 3QQK, 3QQL, 3QRT, 3QRU, 3QTQ, 3QTR, 3QTS, 3QTU, 3QTW, 3QTX, 3QTZ, 3QU0, 3QWJ, 3QWK, 3QX2, 3QX4, 3QXO, 3QXP, 3QZF, 3QZG, 3QZH, 3QZI, 3R1Q, 3R1S, 3R1Y, 3R28, 3R6X, 3R71, 3R73, 3R7E, 3R7I, 3R7U, 3R7V, 3R7Y, 3R83, 3R8L, 3R8M, 3R8P, 3R8U, 3R8V, 3R8Z, 3R9D, 3R9H, 3R9N, 3R9O, 3RAH, 3RAI, 3RAK, 3RAL, 3RJC, 3RK5, 3RK7, 3RK9, 3RKB, 3RM6, 3RM7, 3RMF, 3RNI, 3ROY, 3RPO, 3RPR, 3RPV, 3RPY, 3RZB, 3S00, 3S0O, 3S1H, 3S2P, 3SQQ, 3SW4, 3SW7, 3TI1, 3TIY, 3TIZ, 3TNW, 3ULI, 3UNJ, 3UNK, 4ACM, 4BCK, 4BCM, 4BCN, 4BCO, 4BCP, 4BCQ, 4BGH, 4EK3, 4EK4, 4EK5, 4EK6, 4EK8, 4EOI, 4EOJ, 4EOK, 4EOL, 4EOM, 4EON, 4EOO, 4EOP, 4EOQ, 4EOR, 4EOS, 4ERW, 4EZ3, 4EZ7, 4FKG, 4FKI, 4FKJ, 4FKL, 4FKO, 4FKP, 4FKQ, 4FKR, 4FKS, 4FKT, 4FKU, 4FKV, 4FKW, 4FX3, 4GCJ, 4I3Z, 4II5, 3WBL, 4BZD, 4CFM, 4CFN, 4CFU, 4CFV, 4CFW, 4CFX, 4D1X, 4D1Z, 4KD1, 4LYN, 4NJ3, 4RJ3, 5A14, 5CYI, 5D1J, 5FP6, 5FP5, 5K4J, 5IF1, 5AND, 5ANG, 5ANI, 5ANK, 5ANE, 5IEX, 5IEV, 5ANJ, 5ANO, 5IEY
Enzyme activity
EC #	BRENDA	ExPASy	KEGG	MetaCyc
2.7.11.22	↗	↗	↗	↗

Gene location (Human)
Chr.	Chromosome 12 (human)
Band	12q13.2	Start	55,966,781 bp
Band	12q13.2	End	55,972,789 bp

Gene location (Mouse)
Chr.	Chromosome 10 (mouse)
Band	10|10 D3	Start	128,533,808 bp
Band	10|10 D3	End	128,540,900 bp
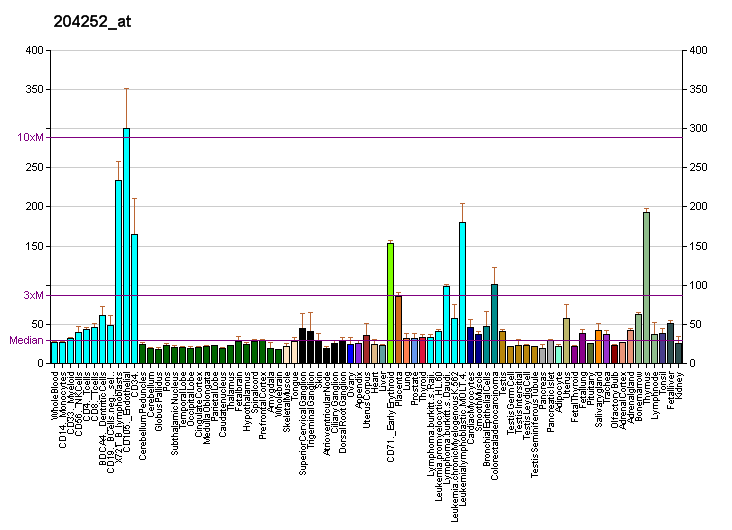
RNA expression pattern
Bgee	Human / Mouse (ortholog); Top expressed in: ventricular zone; ganglionic eminence; left uterine tube; gastric mucosa; stromal cell of endometrium; skin of abdomen; left ovary; skin of leg; right lung; epithelium of colon / Top expressed in: spermatocyte; granulocyte; thymus; ventricular zone; yolk sac; tibiofemoral joint; epiblast; abdominal wall; maxillary prominence; blastocyst; More reference expression data
BioGPS	More reference expression data
Gene ontology
Molecular function	transferase activity; protein kinase activity; nucleotide binding; cyclin-dependent protein serine/threonine kinase activity; histone kinase activity; metal ion binding; protein binding; ATP binding; kinase activity; protein serine/threonine kinase activity; cyclin binding; cyclin-dependent protein kinase activity; protein domain specific binding; magnesium ion binding
Cellular component	cytoplasm; endosome; Cajal body; cyclin-dependent protein kinase holoenzyme complex; transcription regulator complex; X chromosome; Y chromosome; microtubule organizing center; telomere; cytoskeleton; condensed chromosome; nucleus; cytosol; cyclin A1-CDK2 complex; cyclin A2-CDK2 complex; cyclin E1-CDK2 complex; cyclin E2-CDK2 complex; nucleoplasm; centrosome
Biological process	DNA damage response, signal transduction by p53 class mediator resulting in cell cycle arrest; phosphorylation; centrosome duplication; cellular response to DNA damage stimulus; cell division; positive regulation of transcription, DNA-templated; DNA replication; potassium ion transport; G2/M transition of mitotic cell cycle; positive regulation of DNA-dependent DNA replication initiation; peptidyl-serine phosphorylation; mitotic G1 DNA damage checkpoint signaling; cell cycle; cellular response to nitric oxide; Ras protein signal transduction; centriole replication; regulation of signal transduction by p53 class mediator; DNA repair; negative regulation of transcription by RNA polymerase II; multicellular organism development; positive regulation of cell population proliferation; response to organic substance; regulation of G2/M transition of mitotic cell cycle; protein phosphorylation; meiosis; G1/S transition of mitotic cell cycle; anaphase-promoting complex-dependent catabolic process
Sources:Amigo / QuickGO
Orthologs
Databases	NCBI: entry; OMA: entry
Species	Human	Mouse
Entrez	1017	12566
Ensembl	ENSG00000123374	ENSMUSG00000025358
UniProt	P24941	P97377
RefSeq (mRNA)	NM_001290230; NM_001798; NM_052827	NM_016756; NM_183417
RefSeq (protein)	NP_001277159; NP_001789; NP_439892	NP_058036; NP_904326
Location (UCSC)	Chr 12: 55.97 – 55.97 Mb	Chr 10: 128.53 – 128.54 Mb
PubMed search
- Wikidata
View/Edit Human	View/Edit Mouse

Cyclin-dependent kinase 2, also known as cell division protein kinase 2, or Cdk2, is an enzyme that in humans is encoded by the CDK2 gene. The protein encoded by this gene is a member of the cyclin-dependent kinase family of Ser/Thr protein kinases. This protein kinase is highly similar to the gene products of S. cerevisiae cdc28, and S. pombe cdc2, also known as Cdk1 in humans. It is a catalytic subunit of the cyclin-dependent kinase complex, whose activity is restricted to the G1-S phase of the cell cycle, where cells make proteins necessary for mitosis and replicate their DNA. This protein associates with and is regulated by the regulatory subunits of the complex including cyclin E or A. Cyclin E binds G1 phase Cdk2, which is required for the transition from G1 to S phase while binding with Cyclin A is required to progress through the S phase. Its activity is also regulated by phosphorylation. Multiple alternatively spliced variants and multiple transcription initiation sites of this gene have been reported. The role of this protein in G1-S transition has been recently questioned as cells lacking Cdk2 are reported to have no problem during this transition.

== Dispensability in normally functioning tissue ==
Original cell-culture based experiments demonstrated cell cycle arrest at the G1-S transition resulting from the deletion of Cdk2. Later experiments showed that Cdk2 deletions lengthened the G_{1} phase of the cell cycle in mouse embryo fibroblasts. However, they still entered S phase after this period and were able to complete the remaining phases of the cell cycle. When Cdk2 was deleted in mice, the animals remained viable despite a reduction in body size. However, meiotic function of both male and female mice was inhibited. This suggests that Cdk2 is non-essential for the cell cycle of healthy cells, but essential for meiosis and reproduction. Cells in Cdk2 knockout mice likely undergo fewer divisions, contributing to the reduction in body size. Germ cells also stop dividing at prophase of meiosis, leading to reproductive sterility. Cdk1 is now believed to compensate for many aspects of Cdk2 deletion, except for meiotic function.

== Mechanism of activation ==
Cyclin-dependent kinase 2 is structured in two lobes. The lobe beginning at the N-terminus (N-lobe) contains many beta sheets, while the C-terminus lobe (C-lobe) is rich in alpha helices. Cdk2 is capable of binding to many different cyclins, including cyclins A, B, E, and possibly C. Recent studies suggest Cdk2 binds preferentially to cyclins A and E, while Cdk1 prefers cyclins A and B.

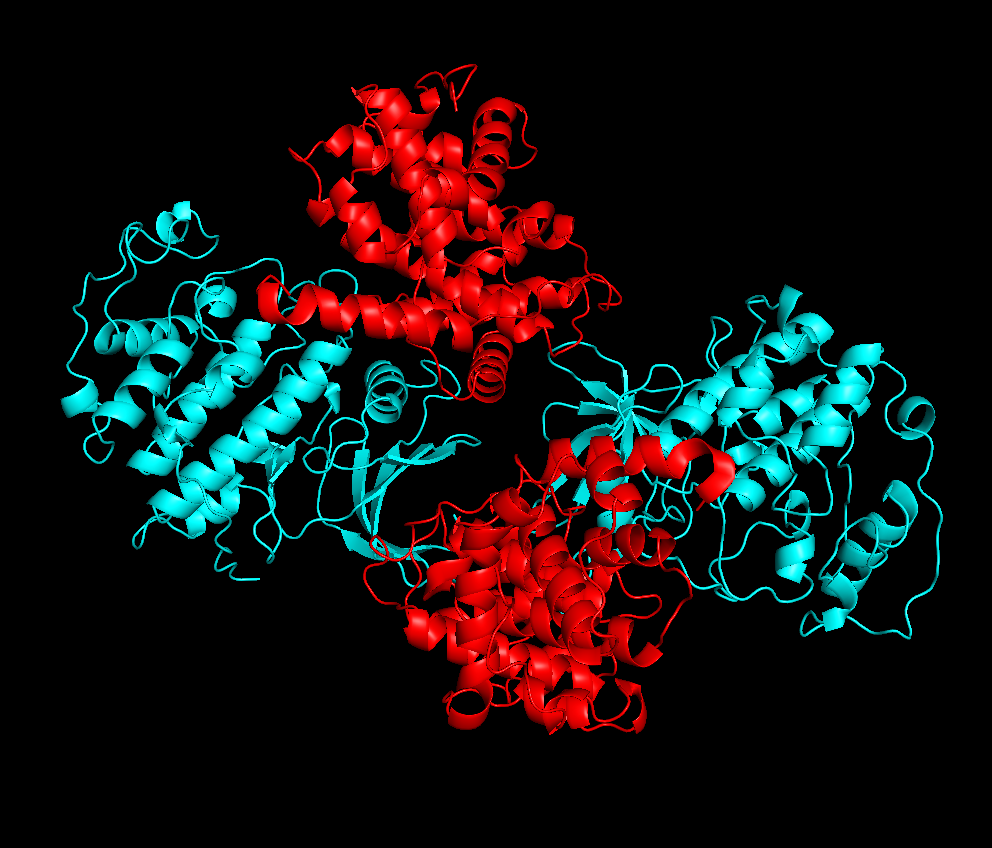
Cdk2 (blue) and its binding partner, cyclin A (red)

Cdk2 becomes active when a cyclin protein (either A or E) binds at the active site located between the N and C lobes of the kinase. Due to the location of the active site, partner cyclins interact with both lobes of Cdk2. Cdk2 contains an important alpha helix located in the C lobe of the kinase, called the C-helix or the PSTAIRE-helix. Hydrophobic interactions cause the C-helix to associate with another helix in the activating cyclin. Activation induces a conformational change where the helix rotates and moves closer to the N-lobe. This allows the glutamic acid located on the C-helix to form an ion pair with a nearby lysine side chain. The significance of this movement is that it brings the side chain of Glu 51, which belongs to a triad of catalytic site residues conserved in all eukaryotic kinases, into the catalytic site. This triad (Lys 33, Glu 51 and Asp 145) is involved in ATP phosphate orientation and magnesium coordination, and is thought to be critical for catalysis. This conformational change also relocates the activation loop to the C-lobe, revealing the ATP binding site now available for new interactions. Finally, the Threonine-160 residue is exposed and phosphorylated as the C-lobe activation segment is displaced from the catalytic site and the threonine residue is no longer sterically hindered. The phosphorylated threonine residue creates stability in the final enzyme conformation. Throughout this activation process, cyclins binding to Cdk2 do not undergo any conformational change.

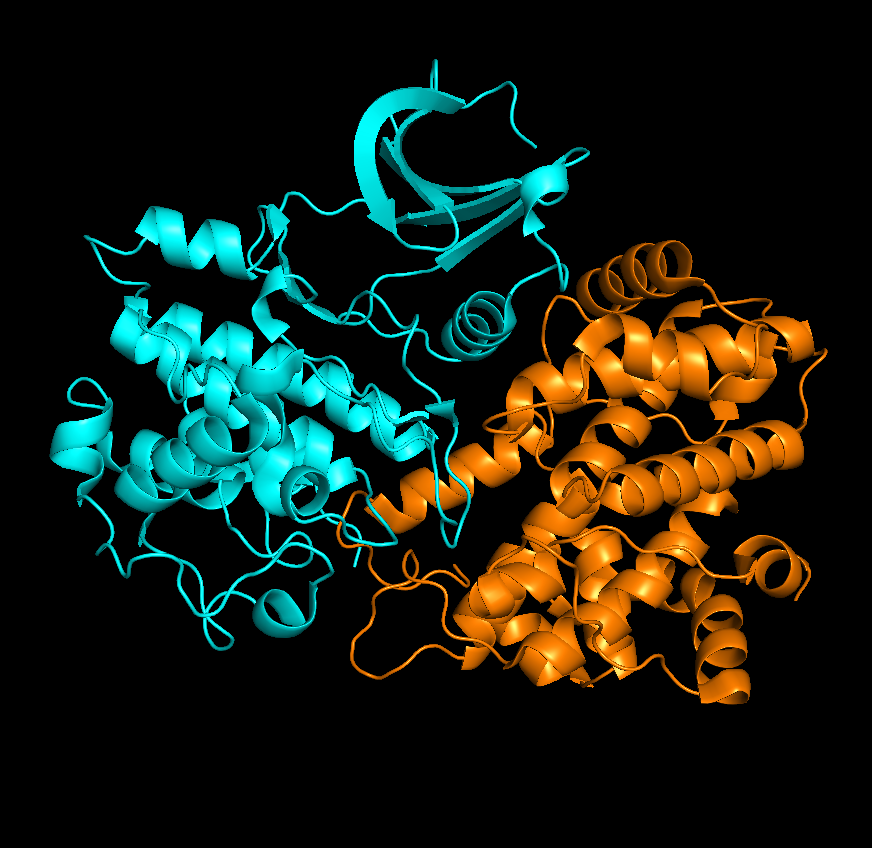
Cdk2 (blue) and its binding partner cyclin E (orange)

== Role in DNA replication ==
The success of the cell division process is dependent on the precise regulation of processes at both cellular and tissue levels. Complex interactions between proteins and DNA within the cell allow genomic DNA to be passed to daughter cells. Interactions between cells and extracellular matrix proteins allow new cells to be incorporated into existing tissues. At the cellular level, the process is controlled by different levels of cyclin-dependent kinases (Cdks) and their partner cyclins. Cells utilize various checkpoints as a means of delaying cell cycle progression until it can repair defects.

Cdk2 is active during G_{1} and S phase of the cell cycle, and therefore acts as a G_{1}-S phase checkpoint control. Prior to G_{1} phase, levels of Cdk4 and Cdk6 increase along with cyclin D. This allows for the partial phosphorylation of Rb, and partial activation of E2F at the beginning of G_{1} phase, which promotes cyclin E synthesis and increased Cdk2 activity. At the end of G_{1} phase, the Cdk2/Cyclin E complex reaches maximum activity and plays a significant role in the initiation of S phase. Other non-Cdk proteins also become active during the G_{1}-S phase transition. For example, the retinoblastoma (Rb) and p27 proteins are phosphorylated by Cdk2 – cyclin A/E complexes, fully deactivating them. This allows E2F transcription factors to express genes that promote entry into S phase where DNA is replicated prior to division. Additionally, NPAT, a known substrate of the Cdk2-Cyclin E complex, functions to activate histone gene transcription when phosphorylated. This increases the synthesis of histone proteins (the major protein component of chromatin), and subsequently supports the DNA replication stage of the cell cycle. Finally, at the end of S phase, the ubiquitin proteasome degrades cyclin E.

== Cancer cell proliferation ==
Although Cdk2 is mostly dispensable in the cell cycle of normally functioning cells, it is critical to the abnormal growth processes of cancer cells. The CCNE1 gene produces cyclin E, one of the two major protein binding partners of Cdk2. Overexpression of CCNE1 occurs in many tumor cells, causing the cells to become dependent on Cdk2 and cyclin E. Abnormal cyclin E activity is also observed in breast, lung, colorectal, gastric, and bone cancers, as well as in leukemia and lymphoma. Likewise, abnormal expression of cyclin A2 is associated with chromosomal instability and tumor proliferation, while inhibition leads to decreased tumor growth. Therefore, CDK2 and its cyclin binding partners represent possible therapeutic targets for new cancer therapeutics. Pre-clinical models have shown preliminary success in limiting tumor growth, and have also been observed to reduce side effects of current chemotherapy drugs.

Identifying selective Cdk2 inhibitors is difficult due to the extreme similarity between the active sites of Cdk2 and other Cdks, especially Cdk1. Cdk1 is the only essential cyclin dependent kinase in the cell cycle, and inhibition could lead to unintended side effects. Most CDK2 inhibitor candidates target the ATP binding site and can be divided into two main subclasses: type I and type II. Type I inhibitors competitively target the ATP binding site in its active state. Type II inhibitors target CDK2 in its unbound state, either occupying the ATP binding site or hydrophobic pocket within the kinase. Type II inhibitors are believed to be more selective. Recently, the availability of new CDK crystal structures led to the identification of a potential allosteric binding site near the C-helix. Inhibitors of this allosteric site are classified as type III inhibitors. Another possible target is the T-loop of CDK2. When cyclin A binds to CDK2, the N-terminal lobe rotates to activate the ATP binding site and switch the position of the activation loop, called the T-loop.

== Inhibitors ==
Interpretation of dynamic simulations and binding free energy studies unveiled that Ligand2 (Out of 17 in-house synthesized pyrrolone-fused benzosuberene (PBS) compounds) has a stable and equivalent free energy to Flavopiridol, SU9516, and CVT-313 inhibitors. Ligand2 scrutinized as a selective inhibitor of CDK2 without off-target binding (CDK1 and CDK9) based on ligand efficiency and binding affinity.

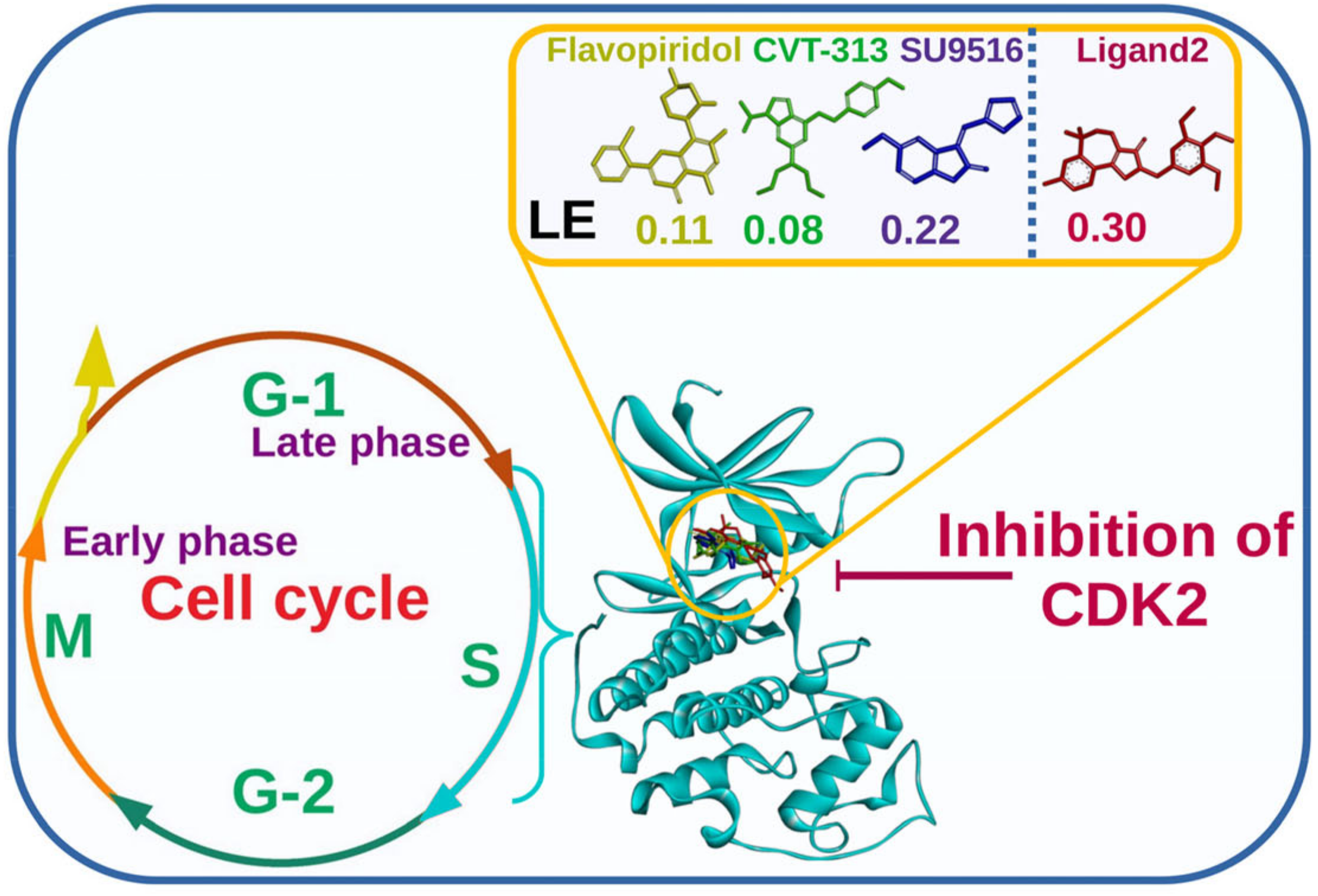
Graphical abstract of CDK2

Known CDK inhibitors are p21Cip1 (CDKN1A) and p27^{Kip1} (CDKN1B).

Rosmarinic acid methyl ester is a plant-derived Cdk2 inhibitor, which was shown to suppress proliferation of vascular smooth muscle cells and to reduce neointima formation in mouse restenosis model.

In 2025, researchers reported the discovery of AZD8421, a potent and selective CDK2 inhibitor. In an ovarian cancer patient-derived xenograft model, AZD8421 demonstrated antitumor efficacy, supporting further investigation of selective CDK2 inhibition as a potential cancer treatment.

See also the PDB gallery below showing interactions with many inhibitors (inc Purvalanol B)

== Gene regulation ==
In melanocytic cell types, expression of the CDK2 gene is regulated by the microphthalmia-associated transcription factor.

== Interactions ==
Cyclin-dependent kinase 2 has been shown to interact with:

- BRCA1,
- CDK2AP1,
- CDKN1B
- CDKN3,
- CEBPA,
- Cyclin A1,
- Cyclin E1,
- Flap structure-specific endonuclease 1,
- ORC1L,
- P21,
- PPM1B,
- PPP2CA,
- Retinoblastoma-like protein 1,
- Retinoblastoma-like protein 2, and
- SKP2.

Overview of signal transduction pathways involved in apoptosis
