= P21 =

Protein

CDKN1A
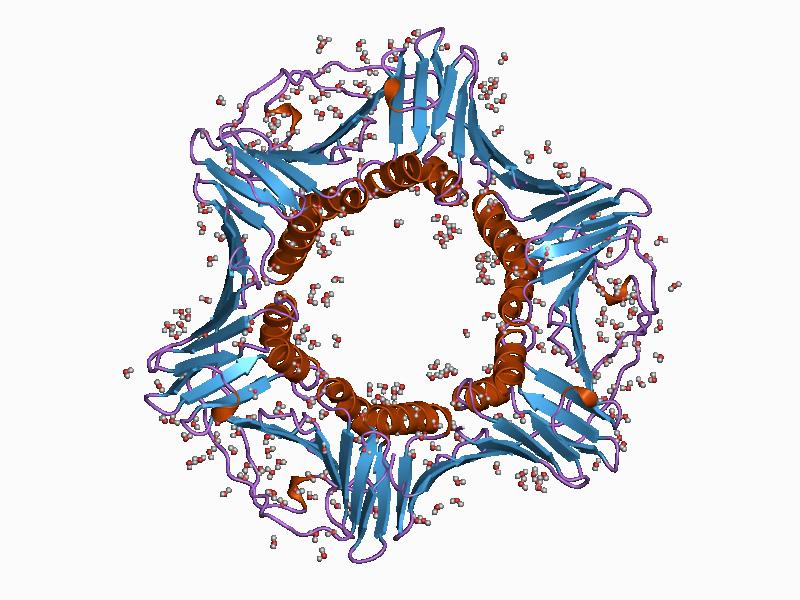

Identifiers
- Aliases: CDKN1A, CAP20, CDKN1, CIP1, MDA-6, P21, SDI1, WAF1, p21CIP1, cyclin-dependent kinase inhibitor 1A, cyclin dependent kinase inhibitor 1A
- External IDs: OMIM: 116899; MGI: 104556; GeneCards: CDKN1A
Available structures
PDB	Ortholog search: PDBe RCSB
PDB	List of PDB id codes 1AXC, 2ZVV, 2ZVW, 4RJF, 5E0U

Gene location (Human)
Chr.	Chromosome 6 (human)
Band	6p21.2	Start	36,676,460 bp
Band	6p21.2	End	36,687,339 bp

Gene location (Mouse)
Chr.	Chromosome 17 (mouse)
Band	17 A3.3|17 15.12 cM	Start	29,309,950 bp
Band	17 A3.3|17 15.12 cM	End	29,319,701 bp
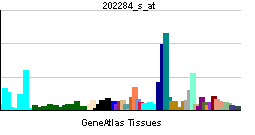
RNA expression pattern
Bgee	Human / Mouse (ortholog); Top expressed in: stromal cell of endometrium; gastric mucosa; vena cava; left uterine tube; beta cell; ascending aorta; saphenous vein; popliteal artery; tibial arteries; Descending thoracic aorta / Top expressed in: stroma of bone marrow; calvaria; molar; pyloric antrum; lip; esophagus; hair follicle; epithelium of stomach; skin of external ear; endothelial cell of lymphatic vessel; More reference expression data
BioGPS	More reference expression data
Gene ontology
Molecular function	metal ion binding; protein binding; cyclin-dependent protein serine/threonine kinase inhibitor activity; ubiquitin protein ligase binding; cyclin binding; cyclin-dependent protein kinase activating kinase activity; cyclin-dependent protein serine/threonine kinase activity; protein kinase inhibitor activity; protein kinase binding; protein-containing complex binding
Cellular component	cytoplasm; cytosol; cyclin-dependent protein kinase holoenzyme complex; PCNA-p21 complex; perinuclear region of cytoplasm; nucleus; nucleoplasm; nucleolus; nuclear body; protein-containing complex
Biological process	cellular response to extracellular stimulus; signal transduction by p53 class mediator; intrinsic apoptotic signaling pathway in response to DNA damage by p53 class mediator; cellular response to heat; regulation of cyclin-dependent protein serine/threonine kinase activity; DNA damage response, signal transduction by p53 class mediator resulting in cell cycle arrest; positive regulation of cell death; response to organic cyclic compound; negative regulation of cyclin-dependent protein serine/threonine kinase activity; stress-induced premature senescence; positive regulation of fibroblast proliferation; replicative senescence; response to hyperoxia; response to corticosterone; cellular response to amino acid starvation; positive regulation of programmed cell death; negative regulation of apoptotic process; response to glucocorticoid; response to arsenic-containing substance; regulation of DNA biosynthetic process; response to organic substance; negative regulation of gene expression; cellular response to DNA damage stimulus; negative regulation of G1/S transition of mitotic cell cycle; regulation of cell cycle; intrinsic apoptotic signaling pathway; cellular senescence; positive regulation of reactive oxygen species metabolic process; cellular response to UV-B; G2/M transition of mitotic cell cycle; positive regulation of B cell proliferation; negative regulation of cell growth; response to organonitrogen compound; animal organ regeneration; regulation of mitotic cell cycle; intestinal epithelial cell maturation; cellular response to ionizing radiation; cell cycle; Ras protein signal transduction; negative regulation of phosphorylation; response to toxic substance; response to UV; response to X-ray; negative regulation of cell population proliferation; protein stabilization; positive regulation of cyclin-dependent protein kinase activity; regulation of transcription by RNA polymerase II; DNA damage response, signal transduction by p53 class mediator resulting in transcription of p21 class mediator; positive regulation of protein kinase activity; cellular response to gamma radiation; negative regulation of cyclin-dependent protein kinase activity; transcription initiation from RNA polymerase II promoter; G1/S transition of mitotic cell cycle; cytokine-mediated signaling pathway; negative regulation of vascular associated smooth muscle cell proliferation
Sources:Amigo / QuickGO
Orthologs
Databases	NCBI: entry; OMA: entry
Species	Human	Mouse
Entrez	1026	12575
Ensembl	ENSG00000124762	ENSMUSG00000023067
UniProt	P38936	P39689
RefSeq (mRNA)	NM_078467; NM_000389; NM_001220777; NM_001220778; NM_001291549	NM_001111099; NM_007669
RefSeq (protein)	NP_000380; NP_001207706; NP_001207707; NP_001278478; NP_510867 NP_001361438; NP_001361439; NP_001361440; NP_001361441; NP_001361442	NP_001104569; NP_031695
Location (UCSC)	Chr 6: 36.68 – 36.69 Mb	Chr 17: 29.31 – 29.32 Mb
PubMed search
- Wikidata
View/Edit Human	View/Edit Mouse

p21^{Cip1} (alternatively p21^{Waf1}), also known as cyclin-dependent kinase inhibitor 1 or CDK-interacting protein 1, is a cyclin-dependent kinase inhibitor (CKI) that is capable of inhibiting all cyclin/CDK complexes, though is primarily associated with inhibition of CDK2. p21 represents a major target of p53 activity and thus is associated with linking DNA damage to cell cycle arrest. This protein is encoded by the CDKN1A gene located on chromosome 6 (6p21.2) in humans.

== Function ==
=== CDK inhibition ===
p21 is a potent cyclin-dependent kinase inhibitor (CKI). The p21 (CIP1/WAF1) protein binds to and inhibits the activity of cyclin-CDK2, -CDK1, and -CDK4/6 complexes, and thus functions as a regulator of cell cycle progression at G_{1} and S phase. The binding of p21 to CDK complexes occurs through p21's N-terminal domain, which is homologous to the other CIP/KIP CDK inhibitors p27 and p57. Specifically it contains a Cy1 motif in the N-terminal half, and weaker Cy2 motif in the C-terminal domain that allow it to bind CDK in a region that blocks its ability to complex with cyclins and thus prevent CDK activation.

Experiments looking at CDK2 activity within single cells have also shown p21 to be responsible for a bifurcation in CDK2 activity following mitosis, cells with high p21 enter a G_{0}/quiescent state, whilst those with low p21 continue to proliferate. Follow up work, found evidence that this bistability is underpinned by double negative feedback between p21 and CDK2, where CDK2 inhibits p21 activity via ubiquitin ligase activity.

=== PCNA inhibition ===
p21 interacts with proliferating cell nuclear antigen (PCNA), a DNA polymerase accessory factor, and plays a regulatory role in S phase DNA replication and DNA damage repair. Specifically, p21 has a high affinity for the PIP-box binding region on PCNA, binding of p21 to this region is proposed to block the binding of processivity factors necessary for PCNA dependent S-phase DNA synthesis, but not PCNA dependent nucleotide excision repair (NER). As such, p21 acts as an effective inhibitor of S-phase DNA synthesis though permits NER, leading to the proposal that p21 acts to preferentially select polymerase processivity factors depending on the context of DNA synthesis.

=== Apoptosis inhibition ===
This protein was reported to be specifically cleaved by CASP3-like caspases, which thus leads to a dramatic activation of CDK2, and may be instrumental in the execution of apoptosis following caspase activation. However p21 may inhibit apoptosis and does not induce cell death on its own. The ability of p21 to inhibit apoptosis in response to replication fork stress has also been reported.

== Regulation ==
=== p53 dependent response ===
Studies of p53 dependent cell cycle arrest in response to DNA damage identified p21 as the primary mediator of downstream cell cycle arrest. Notably, El-Deiry et al. identified a protein p21 (WAF1) which was present in cells expressing wild type p53 but not those with mutant p53, moreover constitutive expression of p21 led to cell cycle arrest in a number of cell types. Dulcic et al. also found that γ-irradiation of fibroblasts induced a p53 and p21 dependent cell cycle arrest, here p21 was found bound to inactive cyclin E/CDK2 complexes. Working in mouse models, it was also shown that whilst mice lacking p21 were healthy, spontaneous tumours developed and G1 checkpoint control was compromised in cells derived from these mice. Taken together, these studies thus defined p21 as the primary mediator of p53-dependent cell cycle arrest in response to DNA damage.

Recent work exploring p21 activation in response to DNA damage at a single-cell level have demonstrated that pulsatile p53 activity leads to subsequent pulses of p21, and that the strength of p21 activation is cell cycle phase dependent. Moreover, studies of p21-levels in populations of cycling cells, not exposed to DNA damaging agents, have shown that DNA damage occurring in mother cell S-phase can induce p21 accumulation over both mother G2 and daughter G1 phases which subsequently induces cell cycle arrest; this responsible for the bifurcation in CDK2 activity observed in Spencer et al..

=== Degradation ===
p21 is negatively regulated by ubiquitin ligases both over the course of the cell cycle and in response to DNA damage. Specifically, over the G1/S transition it has been demonstrated that the E3 ubiquitin ligase complex SCF^{Skp2} induces degradation of p21. Studies have also demonstrated that the E3 ubiquitin ligase complex CRL4^{Cdt2} degrades p21 in a PCNA dependent manner over S-phase, necessary to prevent p21 dependent re-replication, as well as in response to UV irradiation. Recent work has now found that in human cell lines SCF^{Skp2} degrades p21 towards the end of G1 phase, allowing cells to exit a quiescent state, whilst CRL4^{Cdt2} acts to degrade p21 at a much higher rate than SCF^{Skp2} over the G1/S transition and subsequently maintain low levels of p21 throughout S-phase.

== Clinical significance ==
Cytoplasmic p21 expression can be significantly correlated with lymph node metastasis, distant metastases, advanced TNM stage (a classification of cancer staging that stands for: tumor size, describing nearby lymph nodes, and distant metastasis), depth of invasion and OS (overall survival rate). A study on immunohistochemical markers in malignant thymic epithelial tumors shows that p21 expression has a negatively influenced survival and significantly correlated with WHO (World Health Organization) type B2/B3. When combined with low p27 and high p53, DFS (Disease-Free Survival) decreases.

p21 mediates the resistance of hematopoietic cells to an infection with HIV by complexing with the HIV integrase and thereby aborting chromosomal integration of the provirus. HIV infected individuals who naturally suppress viral replication have elevated levels of p21 and its associated mRNA. p21 expression affects at least two stages in the HIV life cycle inside CD4 T cells, significantly limiting production of new viruses.

Metastatic canine mammary tumors display increased levels of p21 in the primary tumors but also in their metastases, despite increased cell proliferation.

Mice that lack the p21 gene gain the ability to regenerate lost appendages.

== Interactions ==
P21 has been shown to interact with:

- Nrf2
- BCCIP,
- CIZ1,
- CUL4A,
- CCNE1,
- CDK,
- DDB1,
- DTL,
- GADD45A,
- GADD45G,
- HDAC,
- PCNA,
- PIM1,
- TK1, and
- TSG101.
