= Cln3 =

Protein

G1/S-specific cyclin CLN3

Identifiers
- Organism: S. cerevisiae (Baker's yeast)
- Symbol: CLN3
- Alt. symbols: YAL040C, WHI1, DAF1, FUN10
- Entrez: 851191
- Orthologs: NCBI: entry; OMA: entry
- RefSeq (mRNA): NM_001178185
- RefSeq (Prot): NP_009360
- UniProt: P13365

Other data
- Chromosome: 1: 0.07 - 0.07 Mb
Search for
- Structures: Swiss-model
- Domains: InterPro

G1/S-specific cyclin Cln3 is a protein that is encoded by the CLN3 gene. The Cln3 protein is a budding yeast G1 cyclin that controls the timing of Start, the point of commitment to a mitotic cell cycle. It is an upstream regulator of the other G1 cyclins, and it is thought to be the key regulator linking cell growth to cell cycle progression. It is a 65 kD, unstable protein; like other cyclins, it functions by binding and activating cyclin-dependent kinase (CDK).

== Cln3 in Start regulation ==
Cln3 regulates Start, the point at which budding yeast commit to the G1/S transition and thus a round of mitotic division. It was first identified as a gene controlling this process in the 1980s; research over the past few decades has provided a mechanistic understanding of its function.

=== Identification of CLN3 gene ===
The CLN3 gene was originally identified as the whi1-1 allele in a screen for small size mutants of Saccharomyces cerevisiae (for Cln3's role in size control, see below). This screen was inspired by a similar study in Schizosaccharomyces pombe, in which the Wee1 gene was identified as an inhibitor of cell cycle progression that maintained normal cell size. Thus, the WHI1 gene was at first thought to perform a size control function analogous to that of Wee1 in pombe. However, it was later found that WHI1 was in fact a positive regulator of Start, as its deletion caused cells to delay in G1 and grow larger than wild-type cells. The original WHI1-1 allele (changed from whi1-1 because it is a dominant allele) in fact contained a nonsense mutation that removed a degradation-promoting PEST sequence from the Whi1 protein and thus accelerated G1 progression. WHI1 was furthermore found to be a cyclin homologue, and it was shown that simultaneous deletion of WHI1—renamed CLN3—and the previously identified G1 cyclins, CLN1 and CLN2, caused permanent G1 arrest. This showed that the three G1 cyclins were responsible for controlling Start entry in budding yeast.

=== G1-S transition ===
The three G1 cyclins collaborate to drive yeast cells through the G1-S transition, i.e. to enter S-phase and begin DNA replication. The current model of the gene regulatory network controlling the G1-S transition is shown in Figure 1.

Figure 1: Regulation of the G1-S transition in budding yeast

The key targets of the G1 cyclins in this transition are the transcription factors SBF and MBF (not shown in the diagram), as well as the B-type cyclin inhibitor Sic1. Cln-CDKs activate SBF by phosphorylating and promoting nuclear export of its inhibitor, Whi5, which associates with promoter-bound SBF. The precise mechanism of MBF activation is unknown. Together, these transcription factors promote the expression of over 200 genes, which encode the proteins necessary for carrying out the biochemical activities of S-phase. These include the S-phase cyclins Clb5 and Clb6, which bind CDK to phosphorylate S-phase targets. However, Clb5,6-CDK complexes are inhibited by Sic1, so S-phase initiation requires phosphorylation and degradation of Sic1 by Cln1,2-CDK to proceed fully.

=== Cln3 activates a Cln1,2 positive feedback loop ===
Although all three G1 cyclins are necessary for normal regulation of Start and the G1-S transition, Cln3 activity seems to be the deciding factor in S-phase initiation, with Cln1 and Cln2 serving to actuate the Cln3-based decision to transit Start. It was found early on that Cln3 activity induced expression of Cln1 and Cln2. Furthermore, Cln3 was a stronger activator Start transit than Cln1 and Cln2, even though Cln3-CDK had an inherently weaker kinase activity than the other Clns. This indicated that Cln3 was an upstream regulator of Cln1 and Cln2. Furthermore, it was found, as shown in Figure 1, that Cln1 and Cln2 could activate their own transcription via SBF, completing a positive feedback loop that could contribute to rapid activation and S-phase entry. Thus, Start transit seems to rely on reaching a sufficient level of Cln3-CDK activity to induce the Cln1,2 positive feedback loop, which rapidly increases SBF/MBF and Cln1,2 activity, allowing a switch-like G1-S transition. The role of positive feedback in this process has been challenged, but recent experiments have confirmed its importance for rapid inactivation and nuclear export of Whi5, which is the molecular basis of commitment to S-phase.

== Cln3 and cell size control ==
As discussed above, Cln3 was originally identified as a regulator of budding yeast cell size. The elucidation of the mechanisms by which it regulates Start has revealed a means for it to link cell size to cell cycle progression, but questions remain as to how it actually senses cell size.

=== Start requires a threshold cell size ===
The simple observation that cells of a given type are similar in size, and the question of how this similarity is maintained, has long fascinated cell biologists. The study of cell size control in budding yeast began in earnest in the mid 1970s, when the regulation of the budding yeast cell cycle was first being elucidated by Lee Hartwell and colleagues. Seminal work in 1977 found that yeast cells maintain a constant size by delaying their entry into the cell cycle (as assayed by budding) until they have grown to a threshold size. Later worked refined this result to show that Start specifically, rather than some other aspect of the G1-S transition, is controlled by the size threshold.

=== Translational size sensing ===
That Start transit requires the attainment of a threshold cell size directly implies that yeast cells measure their own size, so that they can use that information to regulate Start. A favored model for how yeast cells, as well as cells of other species, measure their size relies on the detection of overall translation rate. Essentially, since cell growth consists, to a great extent, of the synthesis of ribosomes to produce more proteins, the overall rate of protein production should reflect cell size. Thus, a single protein that is produced at a constant rate relative to total protein production capacity will be produced in higher quantities as the cell grows. If this protein promotes cell cycle progression (Start in the case of yeast), then it will link cell cycle progression to translation rate and, therefore, cell size. Importantly, this protein must be unstable, so that its levels depend on its current translation rate, rather than the rate of translation over time. Furthermore, since the cell grows in volume as well as mass, the concentration of this size sensor will remain constant with growth, so its activity must be compared against something that does not change with cell growth. Genomic DNA was suggested as such a standard early on, because it is (by definition) present in a constant quantity until the start of DNA replication. How this occurs remains a major question in current studies of size control (see below).

Before the identification of Cln3 and its function, accrued evidence indicated that such translational size sensing operated in yeast. First, it was confirmed that the total rate of protein synthesis per cell increases with growth, a fundamental prerequisite for this model. It was later shown that treatment with the protein synthesis inhibitor cycloheximide delayed Start in yeast, indicating that translation rate controlled Start. Finally, it was also shown that this delay occurred even with short pulses of cycloheximide, confirming that an unstable activating protein was required for Start.

=== Cln3 as size sensor ===
The model of budding yeast size control, in which a threshold size for Start entry is detected by a translational size sensor, required a "sizer" protein; the properties of Cln3 made it the prime candidate for that role from the time of its discovery. First, it was a critical Start activator, as G1 length varied inversely with Cln3 expression and activity levels. Second, it was expressed nearly constitutively throughout the cell cycle and in G1 in particular—unusual for cyclins, which (as their name suggests) oscillate in expression with the cell cycle. These two properties meant that Cln3 could serve as a Start activator that depended on total translation rate. Finally, Cln3 was also shown to be highly unstable, the third necessary property of a translational sizer (as discussed above).

Thus, Cln3 seems to be the size sensor in budding yeast, as it exhibits the necessary properties of a translational sizer and is the most upstream regulator of Start. A critical question remains, however, as to how its activity is rendered size dependent. As noted above, any translational size sensor should be at constant concentration, and thus constant activity, in the cytoplasm as cells grow. In order to detect its size, the cell must compare the absolute number of sizer molecules to some non-growing standard, with the genome the obvious choice for such a standard. It was originally thought that yeast accomplished this with Cln3 by localizing it (and its target, Whi5) to the nucleus: nuclear volume was assumed to scale with genome content, so that an increasing concentration of Cln3 in the nucleus could indicate increasing Cln3 molecules relative to the genome. However, the nucleus has recently been shown to grow during G1, irrespective of genome content, undermining this model. Recent experiments have suggested that Cln3 activity could be titrated directly against genomic DNA, through its DNA-bound interaction with SBF-Whi5 complexes. Finally, other models exist that do not rely on comparison of Cln3 levels to DNA. One posits a non-linear relationship between total translation rate and Cln3 translation rate caused by an Upstream open reading frame; another suggests that the increase in Cln3 activity at the end of G1 relies on competition for the chaperone protein Ydj1, which otherwise holds Cln3 molecules in the Endoplasmic reticulum.
