= G1 and G1/S cyclins- budding yeast =

Cln1, Cln2, and Cln3 are cyclin proteins expressed in the G1-phase of the cell cycle of budding yeast. Like other cyclins, they function by binding and activating cyclin-dependent kinase. They are responsible for initiating entry into a new mitotic cell cycle at Start. As described below, the G1 cyclin, Cln3, is the primary regulator of this process during normal yeast growth, with the other two G1/S cyclins performing their function upon induction by Cln3. However, Cln1 and Cln2 are also directly regulated by pathways sensing extracellular conditions, including the mating pheromone pathway.

== Cln3 ==
Cln3 is thought to be the main regulator linking cell growth to the cell cycle. This is because it is the most upstream regulator of Start and because, unlike other cyclins, concentration of Cln3 does not oscillate much with the cell cycle (see Cln3). Rather, Cln3 activity is thought to increase gradually throughout the cycle in response to cell growth. Furthermore, Cln3 levels differ between mother and daughter cells, a difference that explains the asymmetry in cell cycle behavior between these two cell types. Cln3 regulation also responds to external signals, including stress signals that stop division.

== Cln1,2 ==
The G1 cyclins CLN1 and CLN2, upon transcriptional activation by Cln3 in mid-G1, bind Cdk1 (Cdc28) to complete progression through Start. These cyclins oscillate during the cell cycle - rise in late G1 and fall in early S phase. The primary function of G1/S cyclin-Cdk complexes is to trigger progression through Start and initiate the processes leading to DNA replication, principally by shutting down the various braking systems that suppress S-phase Cdk activity in G1. G1/S cyclins also initiate other early cell-cycles events such as duplication of the spindle pole body in yeast. The rise of G1/S cyclins is accompanied by the appearance of the S cyclins (Clb5 and Clb6 in budding yeast), which form S cyclin-Cdk complexes that are directly responsible for stimulating DNA replication.

Cln1 and Cln2 are involved in regulation of the cell cycle. Cln1 is closely related to Cln2 and has overlapping functions with Cln2. For instance, Cln1 and Cln2 repress the mating factor response pathway at Start. Additionally, both Cln1 and Cln2 are expressed in late G1 phase when they associate with Cdc28p to activate its kinase activity. Lastly, late G1-specific expression for both of them depends on transcription factor complexes, MBF and SBF.
