= Start point (yeast) =

Major cell cycle checkpoint in yeast

The Start point is a major cell cycle checkpoint in yeast, known as the restriction point in multicellular organisms. The Start checkpoint ensures cell-cycle entry even if conditions later become unfavorable. The physiological factors that control passage through the Start checkpoint include external nutrient concentrations, presence of mating factor/ pheromone, forms of stress, and size control.

== Early characterization of Start ==
In an effort to study the ordered events of the cell cycle, Leland Hartwell et al. screened for and characterized temperature sensitive mutants, also known as cell division cycle mutants (cdc mutants), that display arrested cellular development at various stages of the cycle. Hartwell not only identified the mutant, cdc28, which arrests in very early stages of the cell cycle, but he also recognised that the presence of mating factors could result in similar phenotypes of inhibited bud formation and lack of DNA synthesis. Notably, cells that were exposed to mating factors at later stages of the cycle continued division, and only arrested when the resulting daughter cells reached the "early stages" (or more technically, the G1 phase) of the cell cycle. These results suggest that both cdc28 and mating pheromones mediate such early events, and further suggest that there exists a point in the cell cycle where the cell commits to division rather than to mating. Hartwell named this point "Start", where cells are sensitive to mating pheromones prior to reaching this stage, but insensitive to mating factors afterwards.

In the years following Hartwell's labor-intensive experiments, it has been shown that other environmental factors contribute to cellular fate in yeast and analogously in other organisms. Though not yeast-specific, a critical study put forth by Zetterberg et al. in 1985 provided evidence for a commitment point in Swiss 3T3 cells, or mouse embryo fibroblasts, when grown in serum-rich or serum-starved conditions. Like the response to mating pheromones in Hartwell's experiments, the response to serum starvation was not uniform amongst all cells. Only postmitotic cells younger than three hours arrested cellular division in these conditions, while cells older than four hours were insensitive to the absence of growth factors. These experimental results show strong evidence for a commitment point to enter mitosis, and consequently suggest that the cell is capable of sensing its environment for cues like growth factors before committing.

== Transcription of G1/S genes ==
The transcription of several G1/S genes is essential for cells to proceed through the cell cycle. In budding yeast, the transcription of over 200 genes is activated at the G1/S transition. The transcription of these G1/S genes is primarily regulated by two gene regulatory proteins, SBF and MBF. These regulatory proteins form complexes with SCB and MCB, respectively, which are located on the promoters of G1/S genes.

== SBF and MBF regulatory proteins ==
The SBF and MBF complexes are able to activate G1/S transcription only if an inhibitor protein known as Whi5 is dissociated. The dissociation of Whi5 requires phosphorylation by a Cln3-Cdk1 complex. This indicates that the activity of Cln3-Cdk1 plays an important role in the Start checkpoint because of its necessity to simultaneously activate both SBF and MBF proteins. The activity of Cln3 correlates with cell growth rate.

== Activation of S-Cdks by G1/S-Cdks ==
G1/S genes include the cyclins Cln1 and Cln2, which can form active complexes with Cdk1. These activated Cln-Cdk complexes help activate S-Cdk complexes, which are normally inhibited by Sic1. Sic1 has no effect on the Cln-Cdk complexes. The Cln-Cdk complexes activate the S-Cdk complexes through the destruction of Sic1 by phosphorylation and subsequent SCF ubiquitination.

== Mating factor/ pheromone ==
=== Protein interactions between mating pathway and cell cycle progression ===
The response to mating pheromones as described in Hartwell's experiments is unsurprising considering the antagonistic biochemical interactions between the mating pathway and the G1 cyclins that promote cell cycle progression.

As shown in the accompanying figure, the mating pathway consists of a MAPK (mitogen-activated protein kinase) cascade, where Ste5 intermediates the pheromone signal and the downstream kinase responses by Ste11, Ste7, and Fus3. From its downstream effects and even immediate ones, Fus3 ultimately activates Far1, which directly inhibits the activity of the G1 cyclins, Cln1/2.

In turn, Cln1/2 directly inhibits the mating pathway via Far1 and Ste5 inhibition. The activity of Cln1/2 is mediated by activation of a more upstream G1 cyclin, Cln3. Cln3, along with the cyclin-dependent kinase Cdc28, inactivates and promotes the export of the nuclear Whi5. The export of Whi5 results in the partial activation of the transcription factors SBF and MBF, which ultimately promote cell cycle progression. These transcription factors promote Cln1/2 expression, and enhance the cell cycle response by forming a positive feedback loop, as Cln1/2 promotes SBF activation and Whi5 export.

=== Quantitative description of start ===
A modern-day study delineating the relationship between mating arrest and cell cycle progression was put forth by Doncic et al. in June 2011. Recognizing that the amount of nuclear Whi5 is an indicator of G1 cyclin activity, the authors set out to quantitatively understand the point at which cells commit to division. With a microfluidic platform, an asynchronous population of cells was exposed to the pheromone, alpha-factor. Using a Whi5-GFP fusion protein, they tracked the amount of nuclear Whi5 following the addition of alpha-factor, and noted whether the cell arrested or continued division. As expected pre-Start cells arrested cellular division upon pheromone addition, as indicated by the small fraction of Whi5 export. Conversely, post-Start cells were insensitive to alpha-factor and continued division, as reflected by the large fraction of Whi5 export. Thus, the differential response to the presence of pheromones is reflected in whether the cell is pre- or post-Start, states that can be characterized by how much Whi5 is present in the nucleus. Logistic regression was next used to calculate the probability of arrest relative to the fraction of exported Whi5 and showed a sharp switch between arrest and progression when approximately 50% of the Whi5 was exported from the nucleus. It was also shown that this fraction of exported Whi5 corresponds to the activation of the Cln1/2 positive feedback loop (see below). In conclusion this indicates that that Start is defined by the activation of the Cln1/2 feedback loop.

=== Role of Whi5 in cell cycle progression ===
As mentioned above, the G1 cyclins, Cln1/2, are part of a positive feedback loop that promotes their own transcription and the activation of SBF and MBF transcription factors. In 2008, Skotheim et al. proposed that this feedback loop allows for a strong signal to commit to cellular division by the SBF and MBF regulated genes. They hypothesized that without a coherent expression of the genes necessary for early events, like DNA replication and bud-site formation, random individual cellular signals creates noise that weakens the commitment response. Noting the long and asynchronous induction times of CLN2 and RAD27 (a gene in the SBF/MBF regulon) in cln1∆cln2∆ cells as compared to wild type, Skotheim et al. thus concluded that the Cln1/2 positive feedback mechanism allows for a synchronous and more efficient expression of the SBF/MBF regulon.

The authors further observed that Whi5 phosphorylation and consequent inactivation plays a role in this positive feedback response. A Whi5 allele lacking six of twelve phosphorylation sites results in a slow exit from the nucleus, and consequently a less coherent induction of CLN2 and RAD27 expression. Thus, the inability to phosphorylate Whi5 disrupts the Cln1/2 positive feedback loop, and in turn reduces the coherent regulon expression.

=== Molecular dynamics between mating pathway and cell cycle progression ===
To further elucidate a biochemical explanation between mating arrest and cell cycle commitment, Doncic et al. conducted the same commitment assay described above on various mutant strains. The mutant, FAR1-S87A, lacks CDK phosphorylation sites, and thus Cln1/2 inhibition of Far1 is compromised. The result is an increase in the amount of Whi5 export required to commit to cellular division, suggesting that Far 1 phosphorylation is key to cellular commitment. Conversely, the mutant, STE5-8A, lacking CDK phosphorylation sites as well (and thus Cln1/2 inhibition of Ste5 is compromised), does not shift the commitment point, suggesting that such inhibition of the mating pathway is not critical for Start. A further time-lapse analysis of STE5-8A cells reveals that these mutant cells cannot fully commit to cellular division, as cells exposed to alpha-factor will bud and then revert to mating without completing the cell cycle. Doncic et al. proposed that the incomplete division was due to expression of genes in both the mating pathway and in the G1 cyclin-driven cellular progression. Indeed, tracking the expression of FUS1pr-GFP, a mating pathway gene, and of CLN2pr-mCherry, a cell cycle gene, showed great coexpression in STE5-8A cells relative to wild type cells.

Thus, Cln1/2 inhibition of Far1 allows for entry into the cell cycle (Start), while inhibition of Ste5 guarantees distinct expression of genes for either the mating pathway or for cell cycle progression.

== Cell nutrient growth and size control ==
The external nutrient concentrations are extremely important to proceeding through the Start checkpoint. The availability of nutrients is strongly correlated to cell growth size. Cells will not proceed if they do not reach a certain size due to nutrient deprivation, usually nitrogen. Thus, larger cells spend less time in the Start checkpoint compared to smaller cells.

== See also ==
- S-phase promoting factor
- Saccharomyces Genome Database
