= NUDCD3 =

Protein-coding gene in the species Homo sapiens

Identifiers
- Aliases: NUDCD3, NudCL, NudC domain containing 3
- External IDs: OMIM: 610296; MGI: 2144158; GeneCards: NUDCD3
Available structures
PDB	Ortholog search: PDBe RCSB
PDB	List of PDB id codes 1WGV

Gene location (Human)
Chr.	Chromosome 7 (human)
Band	7p13	Start	44,379,119 bp
Band	7p13	End	44,490,658 bp

Gene location (Mouse)
Chr.	Chromosome 11 (mouse)
Band	11|11 A1	Start	6,055,691 bp
Band	11|11 A1	End	6,150,415 bp
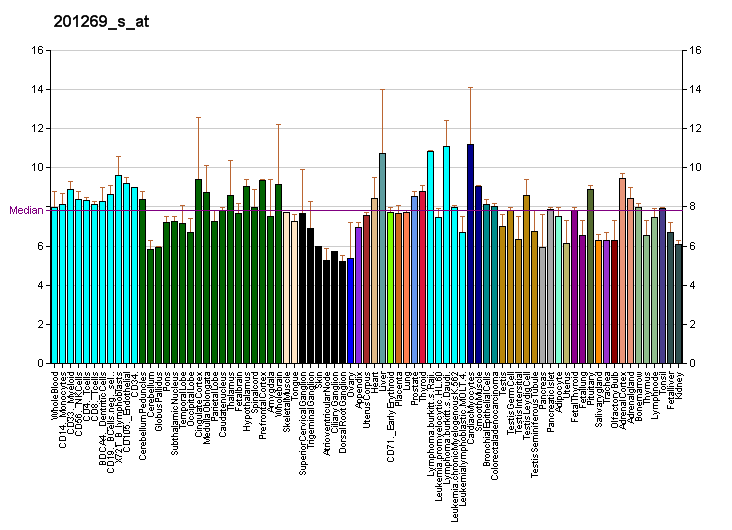

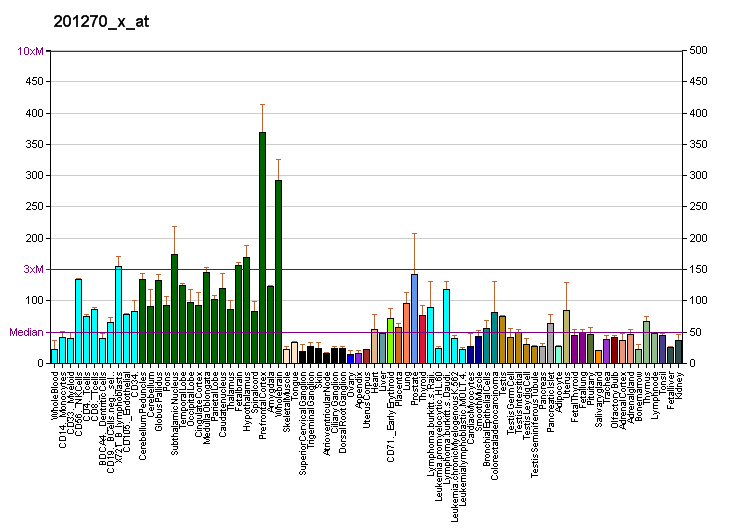
RNA expression pattern
Bgee	Human / Mouse (ortholog); Top expressed in: prefrontal cortex; right frontal lobe; Brodmann area 9; cerebellar hemisphere; right hemisphere of cerebellum; gastrocnemius muscle; stromal cell of endometrium; nucleus accumbens; islet of Langerhans; muscle of thigh / Top expressed in: dentate gyrus of hippocampal formation granule cell; muscle of thigh; primary visual cortex; superior frontal gyrus; dorsomedial hypothalamic nucleus; cerebellar cortex; piriform cortex; temporal muscle; subiculum; triceps brachii muscle; More reference expression data
BioGPS	More reference expression data
Gene ontology
Molecular function	protein binding; unfolded protein binding
Cellular component	cytoplasm; cytoplasmic dynein complex
Biological process	protein folding; cilium assembly; protein localization to pericentriolar material; developmental process
Sources:Amigo / QuickGO
Orthologs
Databases	NCBI: entry; OMA: entry
Species	Human	Mouse
Entrez	23386	209586
Ensembl	ENSG00000015676	ENSMUSG00000053838
UniProt	Q8IVD9	Q8R1N4
RefSeq (mRNA)	NM_015332	NM_173748; NM_001363446
RefSeq (protein)	NP_056147	NP_776109; NP_001350375
Location (UCSC)	Chr 7: 44.38 – 44.49 Mb	Chr 11: 6.06 – 6.15 Mb
PubMed search
- Wikidata
View/Edit Human	View/Edit Mouse

NudC domain-containing protein 3 is a protein that in humans is encoded by the NUDCD3 gene.

== Function ==
The product of this gene functions to maintain the stability of dynein intermediate chain. Depletion of this gene product results in aggregation and degradation of dynein intermediate chain, mislocalization of the dynein complex from kinetochores, spindle microtubules, and spindle poles, and loss of gamma-tubulin from spindle poles. The protein localizes to the Golgi apparatus during interphase, and levels of the protein increase after the G1/S transition.
