= Whi5 =

G1-specific transcriptional repressor WHI5

Identifiers
- Organism: Saccharomyces cerevisiae S288C
- Symbol: WHI5
- Entrez: 854249
- RefSeq (Prot): NP_014726.1
- UniProt: Q12416

Other data
- Chromosome: XV: 0.48 - 0.48 Mb
Search for
- Structures: Swiss-model
- Domains: InterPro

Whi5 is a transcriptional regulator in the budding yeast, notably in the G1 phase. It plays an important role in cell size control in G1 phase, similarly with Retinoblastoma (Rb) protein in human, although the two have no similarity in sequence Whi5 is an inhibitor of SBF (SCB binding factor), which is involved in the transcription of G1-specific genes. Cln3 promotes the disassociation of Whi5 from SBF, and its disassociation results in the transcription of genes needed to enter S phase.

== Roles in cell cycle progression ==
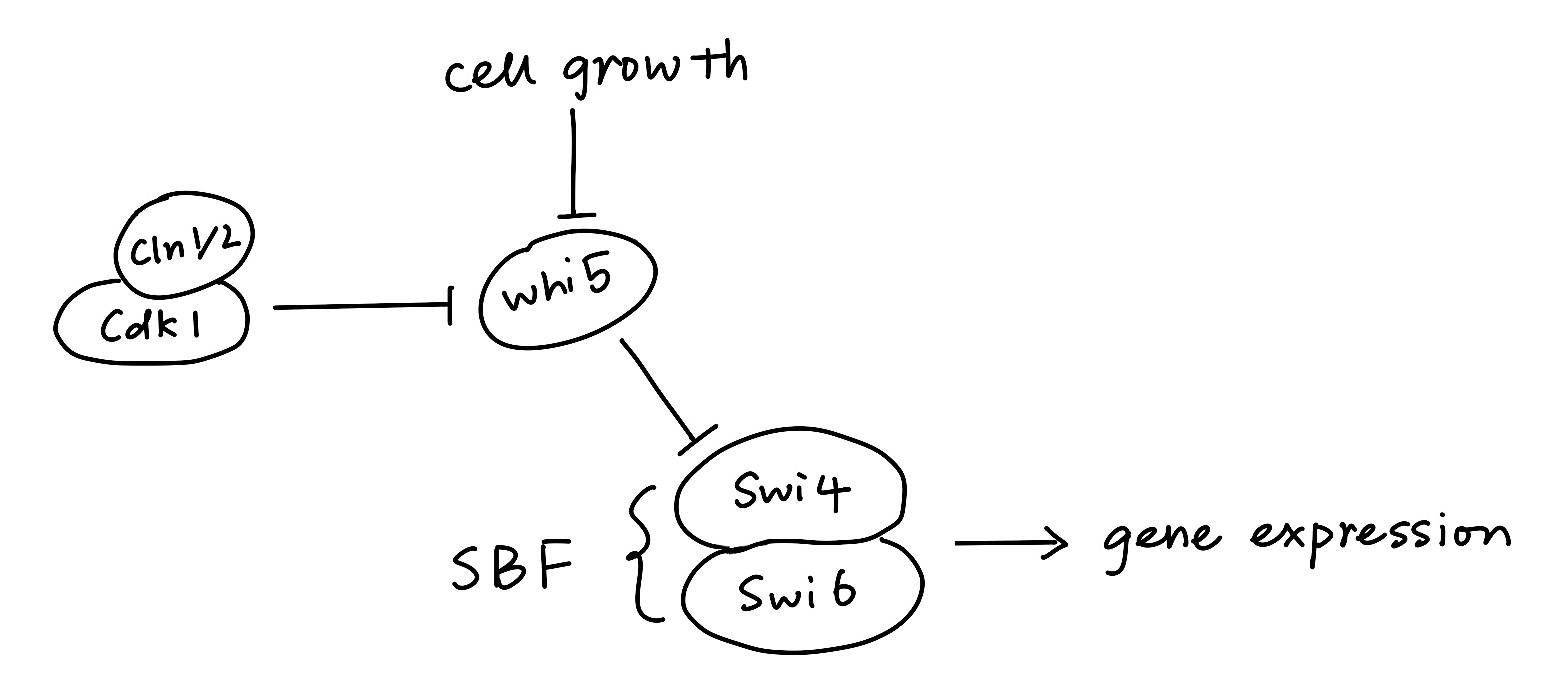
Brief sketch of the Whi5 interaction network

Whi5 plays an important role in the start checkpoint (G1/S checkpoint), which would have an all-or-non response that allow cells into G1 phase, if only internal conditions and external environments are suitable to enter the cell cycle. For example, if the cell is starving, or there is nutrient depletion, it will halt progressing into the cell cycle and enter G0 phase. Once the start checkpoint (G1/S checkpoint) is satisfied, the cell would enter S phase and initiate DNA replication. Specifically, Whi5 would inhibit SBF in early G1 and therefore inhibit the synthesis of Cln1 and Cln2. In late G1, Whi5 activity is inhibited by Cln1/2-Cdk phosphorylation, thus release the inhibition of SBF and downstream genes.

== Whi5 and SBF-controlled genes ==
SBFs (SCB binding factors) are transcription factors that bind to SCB promoter regions, which control the expression of G1-specific proteins, and signal the transition from G1 to S phase. SBF are heterodimers, which contain a DNA-binding unit (Swi4) and a regulatory sub-unit (Swi6). Therefore, activation of SBF will result in the transcription of G1-specific genes. Hypo-phosphorylated Whi5 is stably bound to the SCB promoters via SBF in early G1 phase and suppresses downstream transcription. In the late G1 phase, Whi5 would be hyper-phosphorylated by Cln1/2-Cdk complex, resulting in the dissociation of Whi5 with SBF and exporting Whi5 from the nuclease, releasing the transcriptional inhibition and progressing into G1/S transition.

Once Whi5 is dissociated from SBF-controlled genes, it would result in the transcription of a variety of cell-cycle related genes that allow the cell to enter S phase. These genes include G1/S and S cyclins, which are crucial for the onset of the S phase. SBF-controlled genes are also important for budding and for membrane and cell-wall biosynthesis. Therefore, Whi5 is an important regulator for eventual cell cycle events.

== Whi5 phosphorylation ==
Whi5 contains a total of 19 phosphorylation, with seven sites contributing to hypo-phosphorylation during the early G1 phase, and four sites facilitate the release of Whi5 the SBF complex upon phosphorylation, thus activating G1/S transition.

Cln1/2-Cdk1 promotes the dissociation of Whi5 from SBF through inhibitory hyperphosphorylation. Cdc28 CDK is also believed to involve in this process, which is activated by Cln1, Cln2, and Cln3. Once activated, the association of Whi5 and its dissociation from SBF would result in G1/S transition. Similar with the Rb protein, Whi5 is phosphorylated in various sites during G1, but only certain phosphor-residues would facilitate the transition from G1 to S phase.

Additionally, de Bruin explains that Whi5 phosphorylation determines the timing of SBF-dependent transcriptional activation and cell cycle progression. For example, in a cln3Δ and whi5Δ mutant, cells will enter S phase sooner, because the absence of whi5 bypasses the need for Cln3 activation. Therefore, in a cln3Δ and whi5Δ cell, the timing of cell cycle progression is not regulated by inhibitory phosphorylation by Cln3/Cdk1 and other cyclins, which results in smaller cell size. Thus, Cln3/Cdk1 is important for the dissociation of Whi5 and the timing of when it should dissociate. Whi5 alone cannot determine the correct timing for cell cycle events, but it does affect the onset to begin the transition.

Whi5 would also change its localization depending on phosphorylation levels. In late G1 phase, when Cln1/2-CDK is activated and phosphorylates the CDK-dependent site on Whi5, it not only induces the dissociation of Whi5 from SBF, but also facilitates the export of Whi5 from the nucleus. Whi5 would re-enter in the nucleus in late mitosis, when CDK activity is reduced and CDK-dependent sites on Whi5 become unphosphorylated.

== Whi5 dilution and cell size control ==
Cell growth is a factor that triggers G1/S transition. One of the molecular mechanisms that can regulate cell growth is the dilution of specific cell cycle regulators, whose amount would remain constant as cell volume increases. Whi5 regulates cell size by its dilution: the amount of Whi5 is nearly constant within G1 phase as cell increases its volume. One of the Whi5 inhibitors, Cln3, would remain constant in concentration when cell growth, which would release the inhibition of downstream genes when Whi5 concentration reaches below the inhibition threshold.

Additionally, Whi5 is synthesized in a size-dependent manner in S/G2/M phases: when daughter cells are born, the small cell tends to have a high concentration of Whi5, which keeps the cell in early G1 phase. As the cell size increases, the preliminary Whi5 amount will be diluted in the larger cytosol volume, and the constant Cln3 concentration will be greater than the concentration of the Whi5 inhibitor. Therefore, the concentration of Whi5 and Cln3 can explain why there are timing standards for when the cell will enter S phase. Thus, the Whi5 inhibitor and its coordination with Cln3 are critical proteins that control cell size.

== Similarities between Whi5 and Rb ==
Despite having no sequence similarity and structural homology, Whi5 and Rb protein still share a variety of similar functions. The most significant similarity should be their roles in the G1 size control. Both Whi5 and Rb protein act as an inhibitor in G1/S transition. The amount of both protein would be diluted by cell growth as G1 progresses, which would in turn trigger G1/S transition after reaching the inhibition threshold.

The two protein also share a similarity in the progression of phosphorylation. Both Whi5 and Rb would initially maintain a low phosphorylation level during early G1 (for Rb it would be initially mono-phosphorylated as reported; for Whi5, it would be hypo-phosphorylated). After G1 commitment, Cdk activity increases and both protein would be hyper-phosphorylated and release their inhibition.
