= S-phase-promoting factor =

1. Introduction:
  1. S-phase-promoting factor(SPF) is varying Cdk/cyclin complexes in eukaryotes that initiates the S-phase in the cell cycle. SPF is at its peak when the cell cycle is transiting from G1 phase to the S-phase. The SPF is at its lowest during the cell cycle once the cyclin subunits are used up, and broken down. Therefore, everything that happens during mitosis is irreversible, which is why there are many steps within the cell cycle. However, these steps are irreversible because one is needed in order for the next step to occur.
2. Control of S-phase-promoting factor:
  1. The S-phase-promoting factor is controlled by regulating cyclins levels, and by inhibitors seen in the other phases, such as G1. One specific inhibitor seen in G1 is known as stoichiometric inhibitors, and causes the inhibition of cdk/cyclin complexes. Regulating cyclin levels is done by the production and destruction of cyclin, which is done through the phosphorylation and dephosphorylation of anaphase-promoting complex (APC). This controls the rate of production of cyclin, and regulates cyclin levels and controls the S-phase-promoting factor.
3. S-phase:
  1. During cell replication when DNA is replicated, and is initiated by the S-phase-promoting factor(SPF) cyclin complexes. The DNA replication takes place, due to the increase in SPF during the switching from G1 to S phase in the cell cycle. SPF is also used to inhibit double replication of chromosomes in the cell cycle, which is important for not allowing a duplication of our genome to occur.
4. Cyclins:
  1. There are a variety of cyclins that can be found, and vary based on the type of eukaryotic cell. However, there are two cyclins that are found in all eukaryotes. The presence of cyclin-CDK is crucial for the replication of DNA to occur in the S-phase.
  2. Through different studies done on the effects and contributions to DNA replication, it is clear that certain cyclins hold significant influences over SPF activity. For instance, there was a particular study done on the activity of Xenopus eggs. This research indicated the importance of cyclins A, E and B in regards to the activity of SPF. It was concluded that there was more influence over the activity of SPF with different combinations of cyclins A and E, whereas there was not for cyline B. Specifically, different concentrations contributed to the activity of SPF, which affects DNA replication. Having high concentration of cyclin A within the cell cycle causes mitosis to occur, which directly affects DNA replication by being inhibited. Therefore, the type of cyclins and their concentrations have a direct effect on the activity of SPF when in S-phase, which has an effect on DNA replication.

Cyclins	Species
cyclin E (cycE)-Cdk2, cycA-Cdk2, and cycA-Cdc2 kinases	Humans, frogs and flies
Clb5p-Cdc28p, Clb6p-Cdc28p, and cig2-cdc2	Yeast

The table conveys different eukaryotes, and Cyclin-CDK complexes needed for the species to initiate DNA replication, which occurs in the S-phases.

== See also ==
- Restriction point
