= S phase index =

S-phase index (SPI), is a measure of cell growth and viability, especially the capacity of tumor cells to proliferate. It is defined as the number of BrdU-incorporating cells relative to the volume of DNA staining determined from whole mount confocal analyses.

Only cells in the S phase will incorporate BrdU into their DNA structure, which assists in determining length of the cell cycle.
