= Restriction point =

Animal cell cycle checkpoint

Steps of the cell cycle. The restriction point occurs between the G_{1} and S phases of interphase.

The restriction point (R), also known as the Start or G_{1}/S checkpoint, is a cell cycle checkpoint in the G_{1} phase of the animal cell cycle at which the cell becomes "committed" to the cell cycle, and after which extracellular signals are no longer required to stimulate proliferation. The defining biochemical feature of the restriction point is the activation of G_{1}/S- and S-phase cyclin-CDK complexes, which in turn phosphorylate proteins that initiate DNA replication, centrosome duplication, and other early cell cycle events. It is one of three main cell cycle checkpoints, the other two being the G2-M DNA damage checkpoint and the spindle checkpoint.

== History ==
Originally, Howard Martin Temin showed that chicken cells reach a point at which they are committed to replicate their DNA and are not dependent on extracellular signals. About 20 years later, in 1973, Arthur Pardee demonstrated that a single restriction point exists in G_{1}. Previously, G_{1} had been defined simply as the time between mitosis and S phase. No molecular or morphological place-markers for a cell's position in G_{1} were known. Pardee used a double-block method in which he shifted cells from one cell cycle block (such as critical amino acid withdrawal or serum withdrawal) to another and compared each block's efficiency at preventing progression to S phase. He found that both blocks in all cases examined were equally efficient at blocking S phase progression, indicating that they must all act at the same point in G_{1}, which he termed the "restriction point", or R-point.

In 1985, Zetterberg and Larsson discovered that, in all stages of the cell cycle, serum deprivation results in inhibition of protein synthesis. Only in postmitotic cells (i.e. cells in early G_{1}) did serum withdrawal force cells into quiescence (G_{0}). In fact, Zetterberg found that virtually all of the variability in cell cycle length can be accounted for in the time it takes the cell to move from the restriction point to S phase.

== Extracellular signals ==
Except for early embryonic development, most cells in multicellular organisms persist in a quiescent state known as G_{0}, where proliferation does not occur, and cells are typically terminally differentiated; other specialized cells continue to divide into adulthood. For both of these groups of cells, a decision has been made to either exit the cell cycle and become quiescent (G_{0}), or to reenter G_{1}.

A cell's decision to enter, or reenter, the cell cycle is made before S-phase in G_{1} at what is known as the restriction point, and is determined by the combination of promotional and inhibitory extracellular signals that are received and processed. Before the R-point, a cell requires these extracellular stimulants to begin progressing through the first three sub-phases of G_{1} (competence, entry G_{1a}, progression G_{1b}). After the R-point has been passed in G_{1b}, however, extracellular signals are no longer required, and the cell is irreversibly committed to preparing for DNA duplication. Further progression is regulated by intracellular mechanisms. Removal of stimulants before the cell reaches the R-point may result in the cell's reversion to quiescence. Under these conditions, cells are actually set back in the cell cycle, and will require additional time (about 8 hours more than the withdrawal time in culture) after passing the restriction point to enter S phase.

=== Mitogen Signaling ===
Growth factors (e.g., PDGF, FGF, and EGF) regulate entry of cells into the cell cycle and progression to the restriction point. After passing this switch-like “point of no return,” cell cycle completion is no longer dependent on the presence of mitogens. Sustained mitogen signaling promotes cell cycle entry largely through regulation of the G1 cyclins (cyclin D1-3) and their assembly with Cdk4/6, which may be mediated in parallel through both MAPK and PI3K pathways.

==== MAPK Signaling Cascade ====
The binding of extracellular growth factors to their receptor tyrosine kinases (RTK) triggers a conformational change and promotes dimerization and autophosphorylation of tyrosine residues on the cytoplasmic tail of the RTKs. These phosphorylated tyrosine residues facilitate the docking of proteins containing an SH2-domain (e.g., Grb2), which can subsequently recruit other signaling proteins to the plasma membrane and trigger signaling kinase cascades. RTK-associated Grb2 binds Sos, which is a guanine nucleotide exchange factor that converts membrane-bound Ras to its active form (Ras-GDP $\longrightarrow$ Ras-GTP). Active Ras activates the MAP kinase cascade, binding and activating Raf, which phosphorylates and activates MEK, which phosphorylates and activates ERK (also known as MAPK, see also MAPK/ERK pathway).

Active ERK then translocates into the nucleus where it activates multiple targets, such as the transcription factor serum-response factor (SRF), resulting in expression of immediate early genes—notably the transcription factors Fos and Myc. Fos/Jun dimers comprise the transcription factor complex AP-1 and activate delayed response genes, including the major G1 cyclin, cyclin D1. Myc also regulates expression of a wide variety of pro-proliferative and pro-growth genes, including some induction of cyclin D2 and Cdk4. Additionally, sustained ERK activity seems to be important for phosphorylation and nuclear localization of CDK2, further supporting progression through the restriction point.

==== PI3K Pathway Signaling ====
p85, another SH2-domain-containing protein, binds activated RTKs and recruits PI3K (phosphoinositide-3-kinase), phosphorylating the phospholipid PIP_{2} to PIP_{3}, leading to recruitment of Akt (via its PH-domain). In addition to other pro-growth and pro-survival functions, Akt inhibits glycogen synthase kinase-3β (GSK3β), thereby preventing GSK3β -mediated phosphorylation and subsequent degradation of cyclin D1 (see figure). Akt further regulates G1/S components by mTOR-mediated promotion of cyclin D1 translation, phosphorylation of the Cdk inhibitors p27^{Kip1} (preventing its nuclear import) and p21^{Cip1} (decreasing stability), and inactivating phosphorylation of the transcription factor FOXO4 (which regulates p27 expression). Together, this stabilization of cyclin D1 and destabilization of Cdk inhibitors favors G1 and G1/S-Cdk activity.

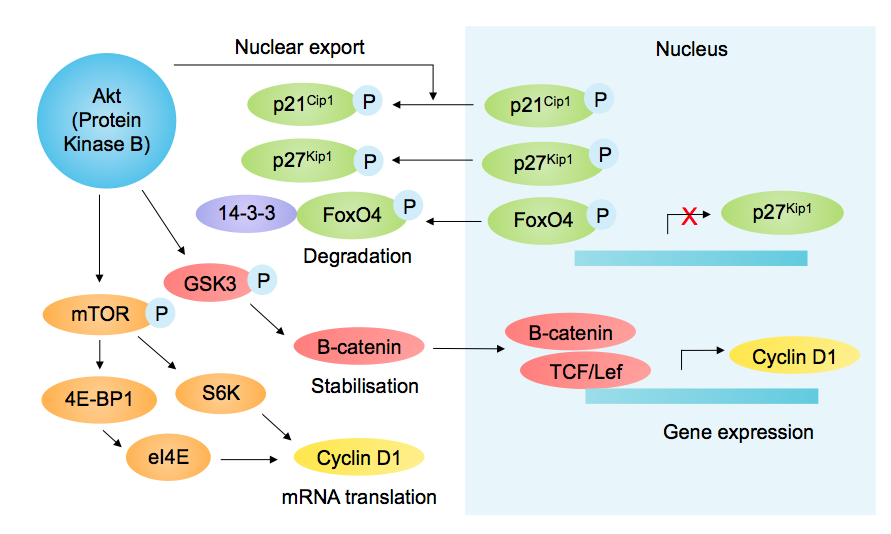
Akt signaling promotes cyclin/Cdk activity

==== Anti-mitogen Signaling ====
Anti-mitogens like the cytokine TGF-β inhibit progression through the restriction point, causing a G1 arrest. TGF-β signaling activates Smads, which complex with E2F4/5 to repress Myc expression and also associate with Miz1 to activate expression of the Cdk inhibitor p15^{INK4b} to block cyclin D-Cdk complex formation and activity. Cells arrested with TGF-β also accumulate p21 and p27.

== Mechanism ==
=== Overview ===
As described above, signals from extracellular growth factors are transduced in a typical manner. Growth factor binds to receptors on the cell surface, and a variety of phosphorylation cascades result in Ca^{2+} uptake and protein phosphorylation. Phosphoprotein levels are counterbalanced by phosphatases. Ultimately, transcriptional activation of certain target genes occurs. Extracellular signaling must be maintained, and the cell must also have access to sufficient nutrient supplies to support rapid protein synthesis. Accumulation of cyclin D's are essential.

Cyclin D-bound Cdks 4 and 6 are activated by Cdk-activating kinase and drive the cell towards the restriction point. Cyclin D, however has a high turnover rate (t_{1/2}<25 min). It is because of this quick turnover rate that the cell is extremely sensitive to mitogenic signaling levels, which not only stimulate cyclin D production, but also help to stabilize cyclin D within the cell. In this way, cyclin D acts as a mitogenic signal sensor. Cdk inhibitors (CKI), such as the Ink4 proteins and p21, help to prevent improper cyclin-cdk activity.

Active cyclin H-cdk complexes phosphorylate retinoblastoma protein (pRb) in the nucleus. Unphosphorylated Rb acts as an inhibitor of G_{1} by preventing E2F-mediated transcription. Once phosphorylated, E2F activates the transcription of cyclins E and A. Active cyclin E-cdk begins to accumulate and completes pRb phosphorylation, as shown in the figure.

=== Cdk inhibitors and regulation of Cyclin D/Cdk complex activity ===
p27 and p21 are stoichiometric inhibitors of G1/S- and S-cyclin-Cdk complexes. While p21 levels increase during cell-cycle entry, p27 is generally inactivated as cells progress to late G1. High cell density, mitogen starvation, and TGF-β result in accumulation of p27 and cell cycle arrest. Similarly, DNA damage and other stressors increase p21 levels, while mitogen-stimulated ERK2 and Akt activity leads to inactivating phosphorylation of p21.

Early work on p27 overexpression suggested that it can associate with and inhibit cyclin D-Cdk4/6 complexes and cyclin E/A-Cdk2 complexes in vitro and in select cell types. However, kinetic studies by LaBaer et al. (1997) found that titrating in p21 and p27 promotes assembly of the cyclin d-Cdk complex, increasing overall activity and nuclear localization of the complex. Subsequent studies elucidated that p27 may be required for cyclin D-Cdk complex formation, as p27^{-/-}, p21^{-/-} MEFs showed a decrease in cyclin D-Cdk4 complexation that could be rescued with p27 re-expression.

Work by James et al. (2008) further suggests that phosphorylation of tyrosine residues on p27 can switch p27 between an inhibitory and non-inhibitory state while bound to cyclin D-Cdk4/6, offering a model for how p27 is capable of regulating both cyclin-Cdk complex assembly and activity. Association of p27 with cyclin D-Cdk4/6 may further promote cell cycle progression by limiting the pool of p27 available for inactivating cyclin E-Cdk2 complexes. Increasing cyclin E-Cdk2 activity in late G1 (and cyclin A-Cdk2 in early S) leads to p21/p27 phosphorylation that promotes their nuclear export, ubiquitination, and degradation.

== Dynamics ==
A paper published by the Lingchong You and Joe Nevins groups at Duke University in 2008 demonstrated that the a bistable hysteric E2F switch underlies the restriction point. E2F promotes its own activation, and also promotes the inhibition of its own inhibitor (pRb), forming two feedback loops (among others) that are important in establishing bistable systems. The authors of this study used a destabilized GFP-system under the control of the E2F promoter as a readout of E2F activity. Serum-starved cells were stimulated with varying serum concentrations, and the GFP readout was recorded at a single-cell level. They found that the GFP reporter was either on or off, indicating that E2F was either completely activated or deactivated at all of the different serum levels analyzed. Further experiments, in which they analyzed the history-dependence of the E2F system confirmed that it operates as a hysteretic bistable switch.

== In cancer ==
Cancer can be seen as a disruption of normal restriction point function, as cells continually and inappropriately reenter the cell cycle, and do not enter G_{0}. Mutations at many steps in the pathway towards the restriction point can result in cancerous growth of cells. Some of the genes most commonly mutated in cancer include Cdks and CKIs; overactive Cdks or underactive CKIs lower the stringency of the restriction point, allowing more cells to bypass senescence.

The restriction point is an important consideration in the development of new drug therapies. Under normal physiological conditions, all cell proliferation is regulated by the restriction point. This can be exploited and used as a way to protect non-cancerous cells from chemotherapy treatments. Chemotherapy drugs typically attack cells that are proliferating rapidly. By using drugs that inhibit completion of the restriction point, such as growth factor receptor inhibitors, normal cells are prevented from proliferating, and are thus protected from chemotherapy treatments.

== See also ==
- S-phase-promoting factor
- Cyclin D
- MAPK/ERK pathway
- p21
- p27
