= Growth factor receptor inhibitor =

Class of compounds

A protein found on the cell surface of some cells that binds to the epidermal growth factor protein. Epidermal growth factor receptor is involved in cellular pathways that control cell division and survival.

Growth factor receptor inhibitors (growth factor inhibitors, growth factor receptor blockers, growth factor blockers, growth factor receptor antagonists, growth factor antagonists) are drugs that target the growth factor receptors of cells. They interfere with binding of the growth factor to the corresponding growth factor receptors, impeding cell growth and are used medically to treat cancer.

Drugs of this type include those that target the epidermal growth factor receptors of epidermal cells (EGFR inhibitors) and those that target vascular endothelial growth factor receptors (VEGFR inhibitors).

== Growth factor receptor inhibitors in cancer treatment and research ==
In cancer treatment, growth factor receptor inhibitors have been used to target cancer cells.

In cancer research, growth factor receptor inhibitors have been applied to protect normal cells selectively from the toxic side-effects of chemotherapy targeted against cancer cells.
