= G1 phase =

First subphase of interphase

Diagram of the G_{1} phase

The G_{1} phase, gap 1 phase, or growth 1 phase, is the first of four phases of the cell cycle that takes place in eukaryotic cell division. In this part of interphase, the cell synthesizes mRNA and proteins in preparation for subsequent steps leading to mitosis. G_{1} phase ends when the cell moves into the S phase of interphase. Around 30 to 40 percent of cell cycle time is spent in the G_{1} phase.

== Overview ==
Schematic karyogram of the human chromosomes, showing their usual state in the G_{0} and G_{1} phase of the cell cycle. At top center it also shows the chromosome 3 pair in metaphase (annotated as "Meta."), which takes place after having undergone DNA synthesis which occurs in the S phase (annotated as S) of the cell cycle.

G_{1} phase together with the S phase and G_{2} phase comprise the long growth period of the cell cycle cell division called interphase that takes place before cell division in mitosis (M phase).

During G_{1} phase, the cell grows in size and synthesizes mRNA and protein that are required for DNA synthesis. Once the required proteins and growth are complete, the cell enters the next phase of the cell cycle, S phase. The duration of each phase, including the G_{1} phase, is different in many different types of cells. In human somatic cells, the G_{1} stage of the cell cycle lasts about 10 hours. However, in Xenopus embryos, sea urchin embryos, and Drosophila embryos, the G_{1} phase is barely existent and is defined as the gap, if one exists, between the end of mitosis and the S phase.

G_{1} phase and the other subphases of the cell cycle may be affected by limiting growth factors such as nutrient supply, temperature, and room for growth. Sufficient nucleotides and amino acids must be present in order to synthesize mRNA and proteins. Physiological temperatures are optimal for cell growth. In humans, the normal physiological temperature is around 37 °C (98.6 °F).

G_{1} phase is particularly important in the cell cycle because it determines whether a cell commits to division or to leaving the cell cycle. If a cell is signaled to remain undivided, instead of moving onto the S phase, it will leave the G_{1} phase and move into a state of dormancy called the G_{0} phase. Most nonproliferating vertebrate cells will enter the G_{0} phase.

== Regulation ==
Within the cell cycle, there is a stringent set of regulations known as the cell cycle control system that controls the timing and coordination of the phases to ensure a correct order of events. Biochemical triggers known as cyclin-dependent kinases (Cdks) switch on cell cycles events at the corrected time and in the correct order to prevent any mistakes.

There are three checkpoints in the cell cycle: the G_{1}/S Checkpoint or the Start checkpoint in yeast; the G_{2}/M checkpoint; and the spindle checkpoint.

=== Biochemical regulators ===
During G_{1} phase, the G_{1}/S cyclin activity rises significantly near the end of the G_{1} phase.

Complexes of cyclin that are active during other phases of the cell cycle are kept inactivated to prevent any cell-cycle events from occurring out of order. Three methods of preventing Cdk activity are found in G_{1} phase: pRB binding to E2F family transcription factors downregulate expression of S phase cyclin genes; anaphase-promoting complex (APC) is activated, which targets and degrades S and M cyclins (but not G_{1}/S cyclins); and a high concentration of Cdk inhibitors is found during G_{1} phase.

=== Restriction point ===
The restriction point (R) in the G_{1} phase is different from a checkpoint because it does not determine whether cell conditions are ideal to move on to the next stage, but it changes the course of the cell. After a vertebrate cell has been in the G_{1} phase for about three hours, the cell enters a restriction point in which it is decided whether the cell will move forward with the G_{1} phase or move into the dormant G_{0} phase.

This point also separates two halves of the G_{1} phase; the post-mitotic and pre-mitotic phases. Between the beginning of the G_{1} phase (which is also after mitosis has occurred) and R, the cell is known as being in the G_{1}-pm subphase, or the post-mitotic phase. After R and before S, the cell is known as being in G_{1}-ps, or the pre S phase interval of the G_{1} phase.

In order for the cell to continue through the G_{1}-pm, there must be a high amount of growth factors and a steady rate of protein synthesis, otherwise the cell will move into G_{0} phase.

==== Conflicting research ====
Some authors will say that the restriction point and the G_{1}/S checkpoint are one and the same, but more recent studies have argued that there are two different points in the G_{1} phase that check the progression of the cell. The first restriction point is growth-factor dependent and determines whether the cell moves into the G_{0} phase, while the second checkpoint is nutritionally-dependent and determines whether the cell moves into the S phase.

=== The G_{1}/S checkpoint ===
The G_{1}/S checkpoint is the point between G_{1} phase and the S phase in which the cell is cleared for progression into the S phase. Reasons the cell would not move into the S phase include insufficient cell growth, damaged DNA, or other preparations have not been completed.

At the G_{1}/S checkpoint, formation of the G_{1}/S cyclin with Cdk to form a complex commits the cell to a new division cycle. These complexes then activate S-Cdk complexes that move forward with DNA replication in the S phase. Concurrently, anaphase-promoting complex (APC) activity decreases significantly, allowing S and M cyclins to become activated.

If a cell does not clear to pass through to the S phase, it enters the dormant G_{0} phase in which there is no cellular growth or division.

== In cancer ==
Many sources have linked irregularities in the G_{1} phase or the G_{1}/S checkpoint to uncontrolled growth of tumors. In these cases where the G_{1} phase is affected, it is generally because gene regulatory proteins of the E2F family have become unrestrained and increase G_{1}/S cyclin gene expression, leading to uncontrolled cell-cycle entry.

However, the cure for some forms of cancer also lies in the G_{1} phase of the cell cycle. Many cancers including breast and skin cancers have been prevented from proliferating by causing the tumor cells to enter G_{1} cell cycle arrest, preventing the cells from dividing and spreading.

== See also ==
- G_{1}/S transition
