= SPDYA =

Protein-coding gene in the species Homo sapiens

Identifiers
- Aliases: SPDYA, RINGO3, RINGOA, SPDY1, SPY1, speedy/RINGO cell cycle regulator family member A
- External IDs: OMIM: 614029; MGI: 1918141; GeneCards: SPDYA

Gene location (Human)
Chr.	Chromosome 2 (human)
Band	2p23.2	Start	28,782,517 bp
Band	2p23.2	End	28,850,611 bp

Gene location (Mouse)
Chr.	Chromosome 17 (mouse)
Band	17|17 E1.3	Start	71,859,056 bp
Band	17|17 E1.3	End	71,896,528 bp
RNA expression pattern
Bgee	Human / Mouse (ortholog); Top expressed in: left testis; right testis; sperm; testicle; Achilles tendon; gonad; left ovary; granulocyte; right ovary; mucosa of transverse colon / Top expressed in: spermatocyte; spermatid; seminiferous tubule; Stroma of ovary; ooblast; lumbar subsegment of spinal cord; morula; embryo; tail of embryo; ventricular zone; More reference expression data
BioGPS	n/a
Gene ontology
Molecular function	protein kinase binding; protein kinase activator activity
Cellular component	nucleus; nucleoplasm
Biological process	multicellular organism development; cell cycle; positive regulation of cyclin-dependent protein serine/threonine kinase activity; male meiotic nuclear division; positive regulation of cell population proliferation; cellular response to DNA damage stimulus; activation of protein kinase activity; positive regulation of protein kinase activity; G1/S transition of mitotic cell cycle
Sources:Amigo / QuickGO
Orthologs
Databases	NCBI: entry; OMA: entry
Species	Human	Mouse
Entrez	245711	70891
Ensembl	ENSG00000163806	ENSMUSG00000052525
UniProt	Q5MJ70	Q5IBH7
RefSeq (mRNA)	NM_182756; NM_001008779; NM_001142634	NM_001142631; NM_029254
RefSeq (protein)	NP_001008779; NP_001136106; NP_877433	NP_001136103; NP_083530
Location (UCSC)	Chr 2: 28.78 – 28.85 Mb	Chr 17: 71.86 – 71.9 Mb
PubMed search
- Wikidata
View/Edit Human	View/Edit Mouse

Speedy protein A is a protein that in humans is encoded by the SPDYA gene.

== Interactions ==
SPDYA has been shown to interact with CDKN1B.
