= PMAIP1 =

Protein-coding gene in the species Homo sapiens

An Error has occurred retrieving Wikidata item for infobox Phorbol-12-myristate-13-acetate-induced protein 1 is a protein that in humans is encoded by the PMAIP1 gene, and is also known as Noxa.

Noxa (Latin for damage) is a pro-apoptotic member of the Bcl-2 protein family. Bcl-2 family members can form hetero- or homodimers, and they act as anti- or pro-apoptotic regulators that are involved in a wide variety of cellular activities. The expression of Noxa is regulated by the tumor suppressor p53, and Noxa has been shown to be involved in p53-mediated apoptosis.

== Interactions ==
Noxa has been shown to interact with:

- BCL2-like 1,
- Bcl-2, and
- MCL1.

== See also ==
- Apoptosis
- Apoptosome
- Bcl-2
- Bcl-2-associated X protein (BAX)
- BH3 interacting domain death agonist (BID)
- Caspases
- Cytochrome c
- Mitochondrion
- p53 upregulated modulator of apoptosis (PUMA)
- 12-O-Tetradecanoylphorbol-13-acetate (Phorbol-12-myristate-13-acetate)
