= TPT1 =

TPT1 may refer to:

- 2'-phosphotransferase, an enzyme
- Translationally controlled tumor protein, a protein
