= BNIP5 =

Protein-coding gene in the species Homo sapiens

Identifiers
- Aliases: BNIP5, chromosome 6 open reading frame 222, C6orf222, BCL2 interacting protein 5
- External IDs: MGI: 1925441; GeneCards: BNIP5

Gene location (Human)
Chr.	Chromosome 6 (human)
Band	6p21.31	Start	36,315,761 bp
Band	6p21.31	End	36,336,888 bp

Gene location (Mouse)
Chr.	Chromosome 17 (mouse)
Band	17|17 A3.3	Start	29,115,366 bp
Band	17|17 A3.3	End	29,134,298 bp
RNA expression pattern
Bgee	Human / Mouse (ortholog); Top expressed in: duodenum; islet of Langerhans; mucosa of transverse colon; testicle; rectum; gallbladder; body of stomach; body of pancreas; appendix; gastric mucosa / Top expressed in: jejunum; large intestine; colon; ileum; left colon; duodenum; Paneth cell; zygote; secondary oocyte; primary oocyte; More reference expression data
BioGPS	n/a
Orthologs
Databases	NCBI: entry; OMA: entry
Species	Human	Mouse
Entrez	389384	207819
Ensembl	ENSG00000189325	ENSMUSG00000048905
UniProt	P0C671	Q8CC96
RefSeq (mRNA)	NM_001010903	NM_172450
RefSeq (protein)	NP_001010903	NP_766038
Location (UCSC)	Chr 6: 36.32 – 36.34 Mb	Chr 17: 29.12 – 29.13 Mb
PubMed search
- Wikidata
View/Edit Human	View/Edit Mouse

BCL2 interacting protein 5, also known as C6orf222, is a protein that in humans is encoded by the BNIP5 gene (6p21.31). C6orf222 is conserved in mammals, birds and reptiles with the most distant ortholog being the green sea turtle, Chelonia mydas. The C6orf222 protein contains one mammalian conserved domain: DUF3293. The protein is also predicted to contain a BH3 domain, which has predicted conservation in distant orthologs from the clade Aves.

== Gene ==
C6orf222 is located on the negative DNA strand of the short arm of chromosome 6 at locus 21.31. The gene is 21,129 base pairs long and extends from base pair 36315757 to 36336977. The gene produces a single transcript that is 3,750 base pairs long. There is a unique upstream, in-frame stop codon in the 5'UTR region from base pairs 86-88 of the mRNA.

=== Gene neighborhood ===
The gene PNPLA1 is found on the positive strand just upstream of C6orf222 and belongs to the patatin-like phospholipase family. PNPLA1 extends from base pairs 36239766 to 36313955. ETV7 is found downstream on the negative strand and extends from base pairs 36354221 to 36387800. There are two genes located upstream (LOC105375036) and downstream (LOC105375037) of C6orf222 on the negative and positive strand, respectively. These genes code for Non-coding RNA.

=== Gene expression ===
There are several lines of evidence that suggest the C6orf222 protein is expressed non-ubiquitously in select tissue locations at low levels, including the ascites, bladder, intestine, testes, vagina, lymph nodes and skin. The ascites and bladder displayed the strongest expression with 25 and 66 transcripts per million, respectively.

=== Promoter ===
The promoter region for C6orf222 is predicted to exist between 36304561 and 36305162 and has a length of 602 base pairs.

== Protein ==
C6orf222 consists of 652 amino acids, has a weight of 71.9 kDa and an isoelectric point of 8.70 in humans.

=== Function ===
While the exact function of C6orf222 remains unknown, there has been evidence for it being involved in apoptosis as a pro-apoptotic protein due to the conserved BH3 interacting domain death agonist located at the C-terminus of the protein between amino acid residues 535 to 611 in humans.

=== Structure ===
C6orf222 contains a single domain of unknown function, DUF3292, found between amino acid residues 38-110. The protein is proline rich but asparagine and tyrosine poor. The charge distribution of the protein is fairly equal in that there are no positive or negative charge clusters sequestered within the protein.

A schematic representation of the conserved domains, nuclear localization signal, and phosphorylated amino acid residues in human C6orf222. The red diamond markers indicate conserved phosphoserine residues and they grey diamond markers indicate conserved phosphothreonine residues.

The secondary structures of the protein were predicted via multiple bioinformatics servers. All four programs predicted extensive disorder in the protein at the N-terminus, ranging from 79% to 88% of the protein. This extent of disorder is consistent with the amino acid composition of the protein and being proline rich. There were several α-helix structures predicted at the C-terminus of the protein and conserved in orthologs of the human protein. The protein was predominantly soluble, with a majority of the amino acid residues being exposed.15 The average of hydrophobicity for c6orf222 was -0.968, indicating the soluble nature of the protein.

=== Post-translational modifications ===
There is extensive, predicted phosphorylation of C6orf222, with 42 phosphoserines and 7 phosphothreonines being conserved in orthologs of the human C6orf222 protein. These results implicate C6orf222 as being a phosphoprotein. The protein contains only one nuclear export signal residue, found at 275-L; however, the NES score was rather low at 0.672. Structural analysis of the protein to be sequestered in the nucleus with a 95% probability. This prediction is supported by the presence of a nuclear localization sequence (NLS) found between residues 142–151.

=== Protein interactions ===
Although the bioinformatics programs MINT, STRING and Gene Cards did not reveal any protein interactions with C6orf222. A predicted BH3 domain in the C6orf222 protein was found to interact with both Bcl-2 and Bcl-xL, implicating C6orf222 as being involved in apoptosis.

Table of Potential Transcription Factor Binding Sites in the Predicted C6orf222 Promoter:

Transcription factor	Start	End	Strand	Matrix Score	Sequence
Myeloid zinc finger protein MZF1	115	125	-	1.000	gtGGGGaggga
Heat shock factor 2	91	115	-	0.953	aggtacctagaaAGAAaggtcagcg
NF-κβ	106	120	-	0.894	gaGGGAggtacctag
GATA-binding factor 2	133	145	+	0.958	caaaGATAactga
Pleomorphic adenoma gene 1	168	190	-	1.000	taGGGGgagaaagtcgaggtggc
TF-yin yang 2	196	218	+	0.839	catttcCCATtaagtcttgtttt
RBPJ-κ	196	208	-	0.951	ttaaTGGGaaatg
Human acute myelogenous leukemia factors	281	295	-	0.834	actGGGGtttgggt
Smad3 TF involved in TGF-β signaling	244	254	-	0.995	aagGTCTggct

== Homology and evolution ==
=== Orthologous space ===
82 organisms have predicted orthologs with C6orf222. The most distant ortholog is the green sea turtle, which diverged from humans 296 million years ago, indicating C6orf222 developed in reptiles and birds.

Table of C6orf222 Orthologs:

Scientific name	Common name	Divergence Date from Humans (MYA)	NCBI Protein Accession	Protein Length (amino acids)	Sequence Similarity (%)
Homo sapiens	Human	0	NP_001010903.3	652	100
Gorilla gorilla	Gorilla	8.8	XP_004043942.1	652	97
Callithrix jacchus	Common marmoset	42.6	XP_002746521.2	678	81
Camelus ferus	Bactrian camel	94.2	XP_006195372	658	62
Physeter catodon	Sperm whale	94.2	XP_007115001.1	638	60
Orcinus orca	Orca	94.2	XP_004267852.1	639	60
Canis lupus familiaris	Dog	94.2	XP_850456	662	58
Mustela putorius furo	Ferret	94.2	XP_004770808	664	57
Oryctolagus cuniculus	Rabbit	92.3	XP_008261475	716	49
Mus musculus	Mouse	92.3	NP_766038.1	669	47
Haliaeetus leucocephalus	Bald eagle	296	XP_010583084.0	407	28
Fulmarus glacialis	Northern fulmar	296	XP_009570924.1	435	28
Chelonia mydas	Green sea turtle	296	XP_007063595.1	387	33

=== Paralogous space ===
C6orf222 rate of evolution in comparison with the fast evolving FAG gene and the slow evolving CYCS gene.

There are no predicted paralogs for C6orf222 in both humans and mice.

=== Conserved regions ===
Multiple sequence alignments demonstrated amino acid reside conservation throughout the C6orf222 protein in a variety of orthologs, with the most extensive conservation being found at the C-terminus of the protein. The BH3 interacting-domain death agonist (BID) was found to be conserved at the C-terminus in a multiple sequence alignment in both strict and distant orthologs. The equal distribution of positively and negatively charged amino acid residues is found to be conserved throughout orthologs of the human C6orf222 protein.

=== Evolution ===
C6orf222 is a fast evolving gene, similar in nature to Fibrinogen alpha chain FGA. This evolutionary trend is in contrast to Cytochrome c, which has been shown to be a slow evolving gene.
