= BOK (gene) =

Protein-coding gene in humans

Identifiers
- Aliases: BOK, BCL2L9, BOKL, BCL2-related ovarian killer, BCL2 family apoptosis regulator, BCL2 family apoptosis regulator BOK
- External IDs: OMIM: 605404; MGI: 1858494; GeneCards: BOK

Gene location (Human)
Chr.	Chromosome 2 (human)
Band	2q37.3	Start	241,551,424 bp
Band	2q37.3	End	241,574,131 bp

Gene location (Mouse)
Chr.	Chromosome 1 (mouse)
Band	1|1 D	Start	93,613,382 bp
Band	1|1 D	End	93,623,486 bp
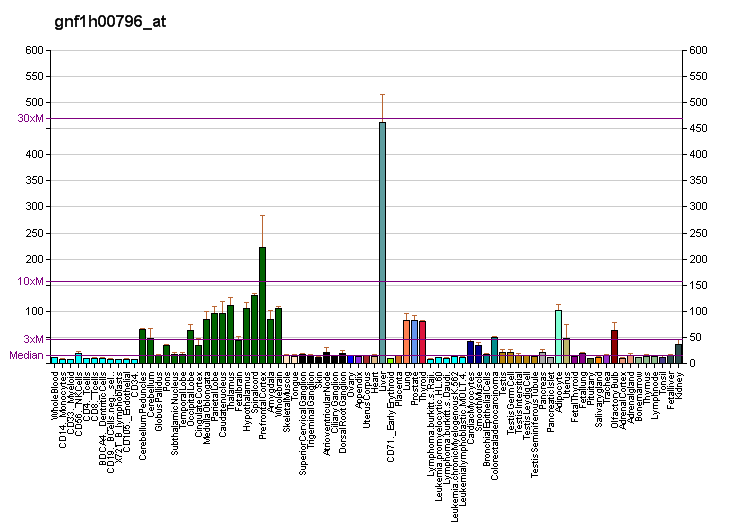

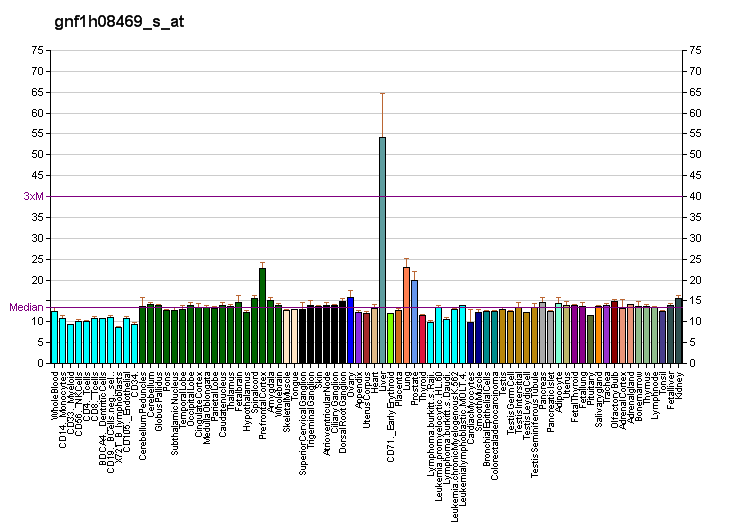
RNA expression pattern
Bgee	Human / Mouse (ortholog); Top expressed in: C1 segment; inferior ganglion of vagus nerve; right lobe of liver; skin of arm; substantia nigra; medulla oblongata; hypothalamus; subthalamic nucleus; adipose tissue; subcutaneous adipose tissue / Top expressed in: decidua; lip; gastrula; Rostral migratory stream; dentate gyrus of hippocampal formation granule cell; right kidney; CA3 field; pyloric antrum; medial dorsal nucleus; cumulus cell; More reference expression data
BioGPS	More reference expression data
Gene ontology
Molecular function	protein dimerization activity; protein binding; signaling receptor binding; ubiquitin protein ligase binding; protein homodimerization activity; protein heterodimerization activity; BH domain binding
Cellular component	integral component of membrane; mitochondrion; nucleus; nuclear outer membrane; cytoplasm; mitochondrial inner membrane; endosome; endoplasmic reticulum; endoplasmic reticulum membrane; Golgi apparatus; membrane; early endosome membrane; mitochondrial membranes; trans-Golgi network membrane; cis-Golgi network membrane; recycling endosome membrane; mitochondrial outer membrane
Biological process	regulation of apoptotic process; neuron apoptotic process; male gonad development; positive regulation of execution phase of apoptosis; oligodendrocyte differentiation; brain development; intrinsic apoptotic signaling pathway by p53 class mediator; cell population proliferation; activation of cysteine-type endopeptidase activity involved in apoptotic process; apoptotic process; release of cytochrome c from mitochondria; cellular component disassembly involved in execution phase of apoptosis; activation of cysteine-type endopeptidase activity involved in apoptotic process by cytochrome c; regulation of autophagy; positive regulation of apoptotic process; negative regulation of neuron apoptotic process; protein complex oligomerization; regulation of cytosolic calcium ion concentration; negative regulation of mitochondrial depolarization; negative regulation of necroptotic process; negative regulation of mitochondrial outer membrane permeabilization involved in apoptotic signaling pathway; positive regulation of mitochondrial outer membrane permeabilization involved in apoptotic signaling pathway; regulation of chorionic trophoblast cell proliferation; positive regulation of endoplasmic reticulum stress-induced intrinsic apoptotic signaling pathway; positive regulation of PERK-mediated unfolded protein response; regulation of granulosa cell apoptotic process; positive regulation of intrinsic apoptotic signaling pathway; intrinsic apoptotic signaling pathway in response to DNA damage; extrinsic apoptotic signaling pathway in absence of ligand
Sources:Amigo / QuickGO
Orthologs
Databases	NCBI: entry; OMA: entry
Species	Human	Mouse
Entrez	666	51800
Ensembl	ENSG00000176720	ENSMUSG00000026278
UniProt	Q9UMX3	O35425
RefSeq (mRNA)	NM_032515	NM_016778
RefSeq (protein)	NP_115904	NP_058058
Location (UCSC)	Chr 2: 241.55 – 241.57 Mb	Chr 1: 93.61 – 93.62 Mb
PubMed search
- Wikidata
View/Edit Human	View/Edit Mouse

Bok (Bcl-2 related ovarian killer) is a protein-coding gene of the Bcl-2 family that is found in many invertebrates and vertebrates. It induces apoptosis, a special type of cell death. Currently, the precise function of Bok in this process is unknown.

== Discovery and homology ==
In 1997, the protein Bcl-2-related ovarian killer (Bok) was identified in a yeast two-hybrid experiment with a rat ovarian cDNA library in a screen for proteins interacting with Mcl-1, an abundant anti-apoptotic protein. The overexpression of Bok induces apoptosis. Because of its high sequence similarity to Bak and Bax, Bok is classified as a member of the Bcl-2 protein family. The mouse homologue of Bok is called Matador (Mtd). This name is derived from the Latin term mactator which means butcher or killer. Additionally, homologous proteins were found in Drosophila melanogaster (fruit fly) and Gallus gallus (chicken).

== Promoter and gene structure ==
The human BOK promoter is activated by the overexpression of members of the E2F hand transcription factor family. Typically, these transcription factors are involved in the promotion of S-phase, so there might be a connection between Bok expression and cell cycle progression. Due to this regulation of Bok expression by the cell cycle, it was proposed that Bok sensitizes growing cells to stress-induced apoptosis.

Bok mRNA comprises five exons which code for a 213 amino acid protein, called Bok-L. This protein consists of four Bcl-2 homology domains (abbreviated BH1, BH2, BH3, BH4, respectively) and a C-terminal transmembrane region (Figure 1). Its BH3 domain contains a stretch with many leucine residues. This is unique among the Bcl-2 family members. The leucine-rich stretch functions as a nuclear export signal. It is recognized by the nuclear exportin Crm1. Mutations in the leucine-rich stretch impair the binding of Crm1 to Bok. Consequently, Bok accumulates in the nucleus and triggers apoptosis.

== Splice variants ==
Due to alternative splicing, Bok mRNA gives rise to different Bok proteins: Figure 1 illustrates the different splice variants schematically. Full length Bok is named Bok-L.

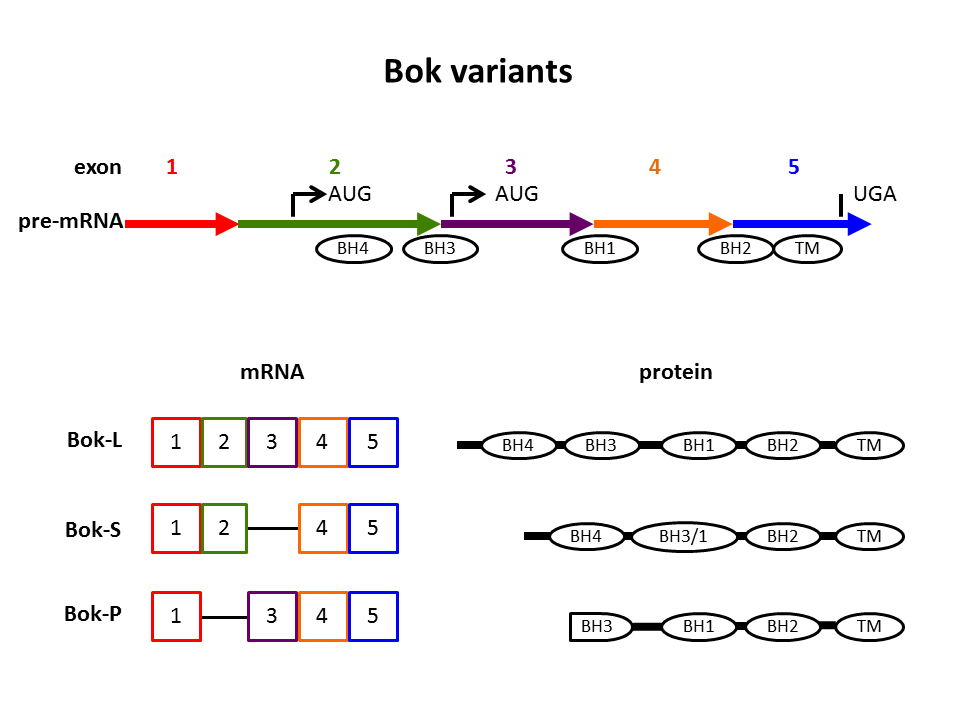
Figure 1: Splice variants of Bok mRNA and the resulting proteins. Bok mRNA comprises five exons and two alternative start codons for translation (AUG). Exons are visualized as arrows and boxes in different colors; ovals indicate sequences that code for Bcl-2 homology domains (BH1, BH2, BH3, BH4) or the transmembrane domain (TM). In the Bok-S variant, the BH3 domain is truncated and fused to the shortened BH1 domain. Another known variant, Bok-P, lacks the BH4 domain and contains a truncated BH3 domain.

The shorter version, Bok-S, lacks exon 3. This results in a fusion of the BH3 domain with the BH1 domain. The BH3 domain is involved in the interaction of Bok with Mcl-1 and other molecules. It is dispensable for the induction of apoptosis. Expression of Bok-S may be an immediate response to stress signals. It has been shown to induce apoptosis regardless of the presence of anti-apoptotic molecules.

Another splice variant termed Bok-P was found in placental tissue from patients with pre-eclampsia. While Bok-S misses exon 3, Bok-P lacks exon 2. This deletion includes the BH4 domain and parts of the BH3 domain. Bok-P may be the cause for trophoblast cell death in pre-eclampsia, a dangerous pregnancy complication. In pre-eclampsia, typical alterations occur in the maternal kidney and lead to hypertension and proteins in the urine. To date, the cause of this medical condition as well as an appropriate treatment have not been discovered.

== Expression pattern ==
The Bok gene is activated and produces protein in different tissues. In mice, elevated Bok levels were detected in the ovary, the testis, and the uterus. Nevertheless, it also exists in the brain and at low levels in most other tissues. However, the expression pattern of the Bok gene varies among species.

In humans, Bok is found in a wide range of tissues. The gene is expressed in the colon, the stomach, the testes, the placenta, the pancreas, the ovaries, and the uterus. Furthermore, more Bok is expressed in fetal tissue compared to adult tissue. Thus, Bok may influence development.

== Subcellular localization ==
The subcellular localization of Bok protein is controversial. In proliferating cells, Bok is found in the nucleus. Upon induction of apoptosis, it was found to tightly associate with mitochondrial membranes. On the other hand, another group found Bok shuttling between the cytoplasm and the nucleus. In their experiments, increased nuclear (not mitochondrial) localization correlated with a stronger apoptotic activity.

== Regulation ==
It was found that the cellular ratio of pro-apoptotic to anti-apoptotic Bcl-2 family members effects late apoptotic events such as release of cytochrome c from the mitochondria and the activation of caspases. Higher levels of pro-apoptotic proteins compared to anti-apoptotic proteins seem to cause apoptosis. In a current model, the formation of heterodimers between pro-apoptotic and anti-apoptotic proteins prevents induction of apoptosis.

== Interactions ==
The binding of Bok to its interacting partners seems to be mediated by its BH3 domain. The splice variant Bok-S lacks this domain and is unable to form heterodimers with other proteins of the Bcl-2 family.

In yeast two-hybrid experiments, Bok was found to interact with the anti-apoptotic proteins Mcl-1, BHRF-1, and Bfl-1. However, interactions with other anti-apoptotic proteins such as Bcl-2, Bcl-xL, and Bcl-w were not detectable (1). Later studies aimed at confirming an interaction between Bok and pro-apoptotic Bak or Bax but were not successful.

Accordingly, coexpression of anti-apoptotic proteins such as Mcl-1 suppresses apoptosis induced by Bok overexpression. Consistent with the results mentioned above, coexpression of anti-apoptotic Bcl-2 does not prevent Bok-induced apoptosis.

== Knock-out mouse ==
Since its discovery in 1997, several attempts have been made to characterize Bok. Due to the increased expression levels in fetal tissue, scientists anticipated a developmental role for Bok. Recently, the Bok knock-out mouse was created. This mouse shows, however, no developmental defects and normal fertility. This finding indicates that the function of Bok seems to overlap with the function of the related pro-apoptotic proteins Bak and Bax.

Several other roles were proposed for Bok, especially in developing cells. Since the action of Bok in triggering apoptosis seems to be redundant, it is difficult to assign a specific role to Bok in the presence of Bak and Bax. The study of cells deficient in Bak and Bok or deficient in Bax and Bok, respectively, could help to better characterize the role of Bok in apoptosis. If Bok exerts a critical function, it is likely that this function is limited to certain circumstances, e.g. specific cell types, stress conditions. Thus, these aspects should be assessed in more detail to analyze the physiological and pathological role of Bok.
