= Laurent Susini =

French molecular biologist

- Education: Paris Diderot University
- Title: associate Professor, PhD
- Scientific career
- Fields: Oncology research; tumor reversion; TCTP
- Workplaces: CEPHB-Fondation Jean Dausset; Caltech; Genethon; Los Alamos National Lab; Genset; Novartis

Laurent Susini (born April 18, 1965) is a French molecular biologist; his research is in the area of cancer and the genetic basis of tumor reversion.

== Career ==
Laurent Susini started at the Centre d'Etude du Polymorphisme Humain (Fondation Jean Dausset-CEPH). He obtained his PhD in Human Genetics and Molecular Biology from University Paris VII - Denis Diderot.

He collaborated with research teams from Caltech and the Los Alamos National Lab. as a member of Pr Daniel Cohen's team at Genethon and at Genset Corporation to contribute to the first physical map of the human genome.

At the Weizmann Institute of Science, in the Lab of Professor Moshe Oren, he demonstrated that SIAH1 induces ubiquitin-mediated degradation of NUMB (gene), a protein that influences cell fate decisions. SIAH1 a p53-inducible gene, plays a role in both cell death and tumor suppression by targeting specific proteins for proteasomal degradation via ubiquitination.

Approaching cancer research with a different angle, not asking why the normal cells become malignant, but rather from the patients expectations: how do my tumor cells quit their malignant status, and thus, revert?, Laurent Susini joined Molecular Engines Laboratories (M.E.L.), a biotech company with headquarters and laboratories located in Paris (France), in 2000, to develop a new generation of innovative drugs against cancer with Adam Telerman and Robert Amson.

By analyzing gene expression and using bio-informatics on cellular models of tumor reversion, M.E.L. researchers identified over 200 genes involved in the process, including TCTP (Translationally Controlled Tumor Protein / Translationally Controlled Tumour Protein. This research has led to the potential development of drugs for cancer prevention and management by inhibiting tpt1/TCTP gene expression.

Laurent Susini joined Oncology Clinical Research in 2007 to contribute to the early clinical development of anti-cancer drugs. He worked first with Quintiles and later joined the Translational Clinical Oncology department at the Novartis Institutes for BioMedical Research, where he designed and conducted phase I clinical trials primarily in melanoma and hematology malignancies.

== Research ==
Laurent Susini has played a critical role in the research of M.E.L founded by Adam Telerman and Robert Amson. More particularly his expertise was instrumental for the genetic and epigenetic analyses of single revertant cells from different cancer cell lines, for the identification of a "drugable" target and for the generation of pharmacological compounds able to kill cancer cells.

TCTP (Translationally Controlled Tumor Protein was identified in a screen between tumor cells and revertant cells. Inhibition of TCTP influences reversion of tumor cells. Therefore, the objective was to develop drugs targeting TCTP in cancers overexpressing the protein.

Translationally Controlled Tumor Protein (TCTP/tpt1) is a regulator of the tumor reversion program, tumor progression and certain forms of inflammatory diseases. Laurent Susini described TCTP as a pro-survival protein antagonizing BAX, Bcl-2-associated X protein, function

== Most cited publications ==
- Chumakov, I.M., Rigault, P., Le Gall, I., Bellanne-Chantelot, C., Billault, A., Soularue, P., Belova, M., Sambucy, J-L., Susini, L., ... and Cohen, D. "A YAC contig map of the human genome. Nature 1995 Sep; 377(6547 Suppl):175-297. Cited 447 times according to Google Scholar
- L. Susini, B.J. Passer, N. Amzallag-Elbaz, T. Juven-Gershon, S. Prieur, N. Privat, M. Tuynder, M. Gendron, A. Israël, R. Amson, M. Oren, & A. Telerman. Siah-1 binds and regulates the function of Numb. Proc. Natl. Acad. Sci. U.S.A.. 2001 98 (26) 15067-15072. Cited 138 times according to Google Scholar
- Susini L, et al. "Biological models and genes of tumor reversion: Cellular reprogramming through tpt1/TCTP and SIAH-1. Proc Natl Acad Sci U S A 2002 Nov 12;99(23):14976-81. Cited 362 times according to Google Scholar
- Bellanne-Chantelot, C., Lacroix, B., Ougen, P., Billault, A., Beaufils, S., Bertrand, S., Georges, I., Glibert, F., Gros, I., Lucotte, G., Susini, L., ... and Cohen, D. Mapping the whole human genome by fingerprinting yeast artificial chromosomes. Cell. 1992 Sep 18;70(6):1059-68. Cited 249 times according to Google Scholar
- Marcel Tuynder, Giusy Fiucci, Sylvie Prieur, Alexandra Lespagnol, Anne Géant, Séverine Beaucourt, Dominique Duflaut, Stéphanie Besse, Laurent Susini, Jean Cavarelli, Dino Moras, Robert Amson, and Adam Telerman. "Translationally controlled tumor protein is a target of tumor reversion Proc Natl Acad Sci U S A. 2004 Oct 26;101(43):15364-9. Cited 315 times according to Google Scholar
- Susini L, et al. (Aug 2008). "TCTP protects from apoptotic cell death by antagonizing bax function". Cell Death Differ. 15 (8): 1211–20. doi:10.1038/cdd.2008.18. PMID 18274553. S2CID 27393934. Cited 266 times according to Google Scholar

== Patents ==
- SCREENING METHOD BASED ON SIAH1-NUMB INTERACTION Publication: DE60120220T - 2007-03-29
- Sequences involved in phenomena of tumor suppression, tumor reversion, apoptosis and/or virus resistance and their use as medicines. Publication: US2005221303 - 2005-10-06
- Sequences involved in phenomena of tumor suppression, tumor reversion, apoptosis and/or virus resistance and their use as medicines. Publication: US2004241671 - 2004-12-02
- Compositions and methods for the treatment of cancers: Composition and methods of treating, preventing, and managing cancer by inhibiting the expression of the gene tpt1/TCTP. Publication: US2004087531 - 2004-05-06
- COMPOSITIONS AND METHODS FOR THE TREATMENT OF CANCER Publication: WO03097835 - 2003-11-27
- New human nucleic acid, useful for diagnosis, prognosis and treatment, e.g. of tumors, also related vectors, transformed cell, polypeptides and antibodies. Publication: FR2822475 - 2002-09-27

== Genes ==
- NUMB,
- SIAH1,
- TCTP,
