= P53 upregulated modulator of apoptosis =

Protein-coding gene in the species Homo sapiens

BBC3

Identifiers
- Aliases: BBC3, JFY-1, JFY1, PUMA, BCL2 binding component 3
- External IDs: OMIM: 605854; MGI: 2181667; GeneCards: BBC3
Available structures
PDB	Ortholog search: PDBe RCSB
PDB	List of PDB id codes 2M04, 4HNJ, 4BPI, 4BPJ, 4BPK,%%s4BPK, 4HNJ, 4BPJ, 4BPI, 2M04

Gene location (Human)
Chr.	Chromosome 19 (human)
Band	19q13.32	Start	47,220,822 bp
Band	19q13.32	End	47,232,766 bp

Gene location (Mouse)
Chr.	Chromosome 7 (mouse)
Band	7|7 A2	Start	16,042,318 bp
Band	7|7 A2	End	16,052,130 bp
RNA expression pattern
Bgee	Human / Mouse (ortholog); Top expressed in: beta cell; vena cava; parotid gland; body of tongue; pons; pericardium; granulocyte; triceps brachii muscle; tendon of biceps brachii; subthalamic nucleus / Top expressed in: granulocyte; external carotid artery; internal carotid artery; left lung lobe; otic vesicle; lumbar spinal ganglion; stroma of bone marrow; lacrimal gland; subcutaneous adipose tissue; brown adipose tissue; More reference expression data
BioGPS	n/a
Gene ontology
Molecular function	ATPase binding; protein binding
Cellular component	lysosome; mitochondrion; cytosol; mitochondrial outer membrane; endoplasmic reticulum
Biological process	apoptotic process; positive regulation of apoptotic process; positive regulation of release of cytochrome c from mitochondria; intrinsic apoptotic signaling pathway; release of cytochrome c from mitochondria; activation of cysteine-type endopeptidase activity involved in apoptotic process; intrinsic apoptotic signaling pathway in response to endoplasmic reticulum stress; execution phase of apoptosis; positive regulation of protein insertion into mitochondrial membrane involved in apoptotic signaling pathway; positive regulation of cysteine-type endopeptidase activity; positive regulation of intrinsic apoptotic signaling pathway; positive regulation of protein homooligomerization; release of sequestered calcium ion into cytosol; negative regulation of growth; positive regulation of endoplasmic reticulum stress-induced intrinsic apoptotic signaling pathway; determination of adult lifespan; response to endoplasmic reticulum stress; cellular response to DNA damage stimulus; positive regulation of IRE1-mediated unfolded protein response; positive regulation of neuron apoptotic process; apoptotic signaling pathway; positive regulation of thymocyte apoptotic process; negative regulation of endoplasmic reticulum calcium ion concentration; cellular response to hypoxia; regulation of apoptotic process; protein insertion into mitochondrial membrane involved in apoptotic signaling pathway
Sources:Amigo / QuickGO
Orthologs
Databases	NCBI: entry; OMA: entry
Species	Human	Mouse
Entrez	27113	170770
Ensembl	ENSG00000105327	ENSMUSG00000002083
UniProt	Q96PG8; Q9BXH1	Q99ML1
RefSeq (mRNA)	NM_001127240; NM_001127241; NM_001127242; NM_014417	NM_133234; NM_001382549; NM_001382550; NM_001382551; NM_001382552 NM_001382553
RefSeq (protein)	NP_001120712; NP_001120713; NP_001120714; NP_055232; NP_001120712.1 NP_001120713.1; NP_001120714.1; NP_055232.1	NP_573497; NP_001369478; NP_001369479; NP_001369480; NP_001369481 NP_001369482; NP_001390600; NP_001390601; NP_001390602; NP_001390603; NP_001390604
Location (UCSC)	Chr 19: 47.22 – 47.23 Mb	Chr 7: 16.04 – 16.05 Mb
PubMed search
- Wikidata
View/Edit Human	View/Edit Mouse

The p53 upregulated modulator of apoptosis (PUMA) also known as Bcl-2-binding component 3 (BBC3), is a pro-apoptotic protein, member of the Bcl-2 protein family. In humans, the Bcl-2-binding component 3 protein is encoded by the BBC3 gene. The expression of PUMA is regulated by the tumor suppressor p53. PUMA is involved in p53-dependent and -independent apoptosis induced by a variety of signals, and is regulated by transcription factors, not by post-translational modifications. After activation, PUMA interacts with antiapoptotic Bcl-2 family members, thus freeing Bax and/or Bak which are then able to signal apoptosis to the mitochondria. Following mitochondrial dysfunction, the caspase cascade is activated ultimately leading to cell death.

== Structure ==
The PUMA protein is part of the BH3-only subgroup of Bcl-2 family proteins. This group of proteins only share sequence similarity in the BH3 domain, which is required for interactions with Bcl-2-like proteins, such as Bcl-2 and Bcl-xL. Structural analysis has shown that PUMA directly binds to antiapoptotic Bcl-2 family proteins via an amphiphatic α-helical structure which is formed by the BH3 domain. The mitochondrial localization of PUMA is dictated by a hydrophobic domain on its C-terminal portion. PUMA protein degradation is regulated by phosphorylation at a conserved serine residue at position 10.[31]

== Mechanism of action ==
Biochemical studies have shown that PUMA interacts with antiapoptotic Bcl-2 family members such as Bcl-xL, Bcl-2, Mcl-1, Bcl-w, and A1, inhibiting their interaction with the proapoptotic molecules, Bax and Bak. When the inhibition of these is lifted, they result in the translocation of Bax and activation of mitochondrial dysfunction resulting in release of mitochondrial apoptogenic proteins cytochrome c, SMAC, and apoptosis-inducing factor (AIF) leading to caspase activation and cell death.

Because PUMA has high affinity for binding to Bcl-2 family members, another hypothesis is that PUMA directly activates Bax and/or Bak and through Bax multimerization triggers mitochondrial translocation and with it induces apoptosis. Various studies have shown though, that PUMA does not rely on direct interaction with Bax/Bak to induce apoptosis.

== Regulation ==
=== Induction ===
The majority of PUMA induced apoptosis occurs through activation of the tumor suppressor protein p53. p53 is activated by survival signals such as glucose deprivation and increases expression levels of PUMA. This increase in PUMA levels induces apoptosis through mitochondrial dysfunction. p53, and with it PUMA, is activated due to DNA damage caused by a variety of genotoxic agents. Other agents that induce p53 dependent apoptosis are neurotoxins, proteasome inhibitors, microtubule poisons, and transcription inhibitors. PUMA apoptosis may also be induced independently of p53 activation by other stimuli, such as oncogenic stress growth factor and/or cytokine withdrawal and kinase inhibition, ER stress, altered redox status, ischemia, immune modulation, and infection.

=== Degradation ===
PUMA levels are downregulated through the activation of caspase-3 and a protease inhibited by the serpase inhibitor N-tosyl-L-phenylalanine chloromethyl ketone, in response to signals such as the cytokine TGFβ, the death effector TRAIL or chemical drugs such as anisomycin. PUMA protein is degraded in a proteasome dependent manner and its degradation is regulated by phosphorylation at a conserved serine residue at position 10.

== Role in cancer ==
Several studies have shown that PUMA function is affected or absent in cancer cells. Additionally, many human tumors contain p53 mutations, which results in no induction of PUMA, even after DNA damage induced through irradiation or chemotherapy drugs. Other cancers, which exhibit overexpression of antiapoptotic Bcl-2 family proteins, counteract and overpower PUMA-induced apoptosis. Even though PUMA function is compromised in most cancer cells, it does not appear that genetic inactivation of PUMA is a direct target of cancer. Many cancers do exhibit p53 gene mutations, making gene therapies that target this gene impossible, but an alternate pathway may be to focus on therapeutic to target PUMA and induce apoptosis in cancer cells. Animal studies have shown that PUMA does play a role in tumor suppression, but lack of PUMA activity alone does not translate to spontaneous formation of malignancies. Inhibiting PUMA induced apoptosis may be an interesting target for reducing the side effects of cancer treatments, such as chemotherapy, which induce apoptosis in rapidly dividing healthy cells in addition to rapidly dividing cancer cells.

PUMA can also function as an indicator of p53 mutations. Many cancers exhibit mutations in the p53 gene, but this mutation can only be detected through extensive DNA sequencing. Studies have shown that cells with p53 mutations have significantly lower levels of PUMA, making it a good candidate for a protein marker of p53 mutations, providing a simpler method for testing for p53 mutations.

== Cancer therapeutics ==
Therapeutic agents targeting PUMA for cancer patients are emerging. PUMA inducers target cancer or tumor cells, while PUMA inhibitors can be targeted to normal, healthy cells to help alleviate the undesired side effects of chemo and radiation therapy.

=== Cancer treatments ===
Research has shown that increased PUMA expression with or without chemotherapy or irradiation is highly toxic to cancer cells, specifically lung, head and neck, esophagus, melanoma, malignant glioma, gastric glands, breast and prostate. In addition, studies have shown that PUMA adenovirus seems to induce apoptosis more so than p53 adenovirus. This is beneficial in combating cancers that inhibit p53 activation and therefore indirectly decrease PUMA expression levels.

Resveratrol, a plant-derived stilbenoid, is currently under investigation as a cancer treatment. Resveratrol acts to inhibit and decrease expression of antiapoptotic Bcl-2 family members while also increasing p53 expression. The combination of these two mechanisms leads to apoptosis via activation of PUMA, Noxa and other proapoptotic proteins, resulting in mitochondrial dysfunction.

Other approaches focus on inhibiting antiapoptotic Bcl-2 family members just as PUMA does, allowing cells to undergo apoptosis in response to cancerous activity. Preclinical studies involving these inhibitors, also described as BH3 mimetics, have produced promising results.

=== Side-effect treatment ===
Irradiation therapy is dose-limited by undesired side effects in healthy tissue. PUMA has been shown to be active in inducing apoptosis in hematopoietic and intestinal tissue following γ-irradiation. Since inhibition of PUMA does not directly cause spontaneous malignancies, therapeutics to inhibit PUMA function in healthy tissue could lessen or eliminate the side effects of traditional cancer therapies.

== See also ==
- Apoptosis
- Apoptosome
- Bcl-2
- Bcl-2-associated X protein (BAX)
- BH3 interacting domain death agonist (BID)
- Caspases
- Cytochrome c
- Noxa
- Mitochondrion
