= Mitochondrial outer membrane permeabilization =

Mitochondrial outer membrane permeabilization (MOMP), also known as the mitochondrial outer membrane permeability, is one of two ways apoptosis (a type of programmed cell death) can be activated. It is part of the intrinsic pathway of apoptosis, also known as the mitochondrial pathway. MOMP is known as the point of no return in apoptosis. Once triggered, it results in the diffusion of proteins from the space between the inner and outer mitochondrial membranes into the cytosol.

== Mechanism ==
Initiation of MOMP involves Bcl-2 family proteins, including BAX and BAK. The outer mitochondrial membrane, typically permeable to molecules smaller than 5 kDa, forms pores during MOMP that allow it to accommodate proteins larger than 100 kDa. During MOMP, it takes about five minutes for all mitochondrial membranes within a cell to permeabilize.

=== Bile acid cytotoxicity ===
A comprehensive and comparative study was conduction on the impact of cytotoxic and cytoprotective bile acids on the membrane structure of different cellular compartments. The mitochondrial outer membranes appear to be the main target of the cytotoxic bile acid deoxycholic acid. The mitochondrial membranes were more sensitive to deoxycholic acid induced structural changes than the cell's plasma membrane and these changes preceded the mitochondrial permeability transition. The disruption of mitochondrial outer membranes by bile acids causes the release of reactive oxygen species that may have further consequences including damage to the cells DNA.

== Outcome ==
MOMP has been referred to as the point of no return for apoptosis, almost always resulting in the completion of the process, and thus, cell death. However, in limited circumstances, apoptosis does not complete. Sometimes, MOMP does not complete, known as incomplete MOMP (iMOMP) or minority MOMP (miniMOMP). For incomplete MOMP, mitochondrial membranes become permeable in most, but not all, the cell's mitochondria. In minority MOMP, only a few mitochondria of the cell experience MOMP—the result of sublethal stress.
