= MOMP (disambiguation) =

MOMP or MoMP may refer to:

== Places ==
- Mid-Ocean Meeting Point: World War II Allied meeting point south of Iceland

== Science and technology ==
- Meanings of minor planets: list explaining the assigned names of minor planets
- Mitochondrial outer membrane permeabilization: Process during cellular apoptosis
- Major outer membrane protein: protein constituent of the bacterial pathogen Chlamydia trachomatis
