= Susini =

Susini is a surname. Notable people with the surname include:

- Annick de Susini (born 1960), French swimmer
- Clemente Susini (1754–1814), Italian sculptor
- Enrique Telémaco Susini (1891-1972), Argentine media entrepreneur
- Giovanni Francesco Susini (c.1585 – c. 1653), Italian sculptor
- Jean-Jacques Susini (1933–2017), French political figure
- Laurent Susini (born 1965), French molecular biologist
- Telémaco Susini (1856–1936), Argentinian physician
