= GPALPP1 =

Protein-coding gene in the species Homo sapiens

Identifiers
- Aliases: GPALPP1, KIAA1704, LSR7, bA245H20.2, AD029, GPALPP motifs containing 1
- External IDs: MGI: 1914717; HomoloGene: 10234; GeneCards: GPALPP1; OMA:GPALPP1 - orthologs

Gene location (Human)
Chr.	Chromosome 13 (human)
Band	13q14.12	Start	44,989,529 bp
Band	13q14.12	End	45,037,669 bp

Gene location (Mouse)
Chr.	Chromosome 14 (mouse)
Band	14|14 D3	Start	76,323,676 bp
Band	14|14 D3	End	76,348,200 bp
RNA expression pattern
Bgee	Human / Mouse (ortholog); Top expressed in: endothelial cell; Brodmann area 23; cerebellar hemisphere; Achilles tendon; middle temporal gyrus; right hemisphere of cerebellum; primary visual cortex; nucleus accumbens; anterior cingulate cortex; dorsolateral prefrontal cortex / Top expressed in: saccule; otic placode; otic vesicle; cumulus cell; retinal pigment epithelium; vestibular sensory epithelium; vestibular membrane of cochlear duct; ciliary body; blood; primitive streak; More reference expression data
BioGPS	n/a
Orthologs
Species	Human	Mouse
Entrez	55425	67467
Ensembl	ENSG00000133114	ENSMUSG00000022008
UniProt	Q8IXQ4	Q69ZC8
RefSeq (mRNA)	NM_018559; NM_001316951; NM_001316952	NM_026177
RefSeq (protein)	NP_001303880; NP_001303881; NP_061029	NP_080453
Location (UCSC)	Chr 13: 44.99 – 45.04 Mb	Chr 14: 76.32 – 76.35 Mb
PubMed search
- Wikidata
View/Edit Human	View/Edit Mouse

GPALPP motifs-containing protein 1, also known as LSR7 (lipopolysaccharide-specific response protein 7), is a protein that in humans is encoded by the GPALPP1 (GPALPP motifs containing 1) gene (previously KIAA1704). The function of the protein GPALPP1 is not yet well understood. GPALPP1 contains one domain of unknown function, DUF3752. The protein contains a conserved, uncharged, repeated motif GPALPP(GF) near the N terminus and an unusual, conserved, mixed charge throughout (alternating readily between positive and negative charges). It is predicted to be localized to the nucleus.

== Clinical significance ==
GPALPP1 has at least a 5 fold expression loss associated with mantle cell lymphoma.

In a second study, researchers used a linkage disequilibrium mapping study of locus 13q13-14 to investigate potential susceptibility for autism over a 1.5 Mb linkage peak, including GPALPP1. A single marker PDTPhase analysis was performed for four SNPs for GPALPP1; however, none of the SNPs were statistically significant in associating the marker with the loci.

An expression study found that GPALPP1 is significantly up-regulated in U937 cells (macrophage-like human cell line) when treated with nicotine.

== Properties ==
Number of Exons	mRNA sequence length (bp)	Protein sequence length (aa)	Molecular Weight (kD)	Isoelectric point
8	1431	340	38.1	5.0526

== Gene ==
=== Location ===
GPALPP1 is found on the chromosome 13, at locus q14.12, with the genomic sequence starting at 45,563,687 bp and ending at 45,602,405 bp.

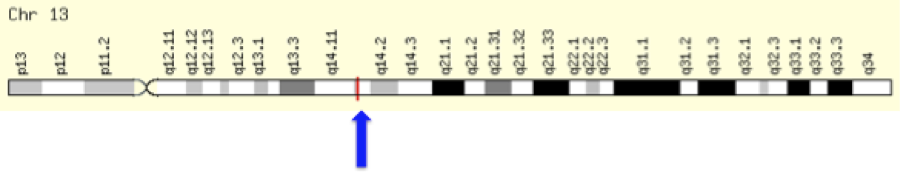
GPALPP1 chromosomal location

=== Gene Neighborhood ===
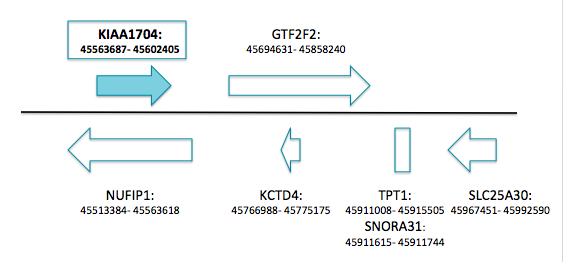
GPALPP1GeneNeighborhood

GPALPP1 is located on the positive strand surrounded by 5 nearby genes.

Positive Orientation

- General Transcription Factor IIF (GTF2F2) is further downstream directed in the same orientation. Functionally, it binds to RNA Polymerase II.

Negative Orientation

- Nuclear Fragile X Mental Retardation Protein Interacting Protein 1 (NUFIp1) shows RNA-binding activity with specific nuclear role for FMRP. This is an RNA-binding protein associated with Fragile X. Start sites are antisense to start of GPALPP1.
- Potassium Channel Tetramerisation Domain Containing 4 (KCTD4) proposed to participate in potassium ion transport.
- Tumor protein translationally controlled 1 (TPT1) is involved in calcium binding and microtubule stabilization.
- Small nucleolar RNA, H/ACA box 31 (SNORA31) does not have a known function at this time.

=== Expression ===
GPALPP1 has ubiquitous low to moderate expression patterns across body tissues (below 50%)

NCBI GDS596 Microarray Expression Data

=== Promoter ===
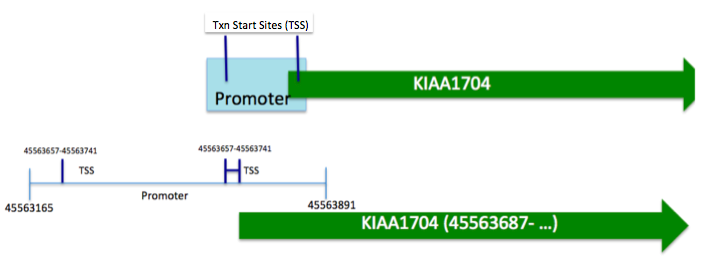
GPALPP1 Promoter Prediction

Using GenoMatix ElDorado analysis tools, the promoter was predicted to be 727 base pairs in length projecting into exon 1. There are two predicted transcriptional start sites for this promoter, shown on the adjacent image.

GPALPP1 promoter showed significant histone 3 lysine 4 trimethylation peaks in K562 cells (erythroid cell line). It also showed increased relative expression in erythroid progenitors along with gene neighbors, NUFIP1 and TPT1.

An additional study found that the proximal promoter is one of many thousand direct targets of transcription factor, Myc, in vivo.

== mRNA ==
=== Splice Variants ===
According to Ensembl, there are four coding splice variants. None of the alternative splice forms have experimental evidence associated. One splice variant undergoes non-sense mediated decay while another is predicted to splice the gene directly in half and retain amino acids 171–340.

=== Conservation ===
NCBI BLAST searches reveal that known mRNA orthologs exist in mammals, reptiles, birds, frogs, and fish with at least 65% sequence identity.

== Protein ==
=== General Properties ===
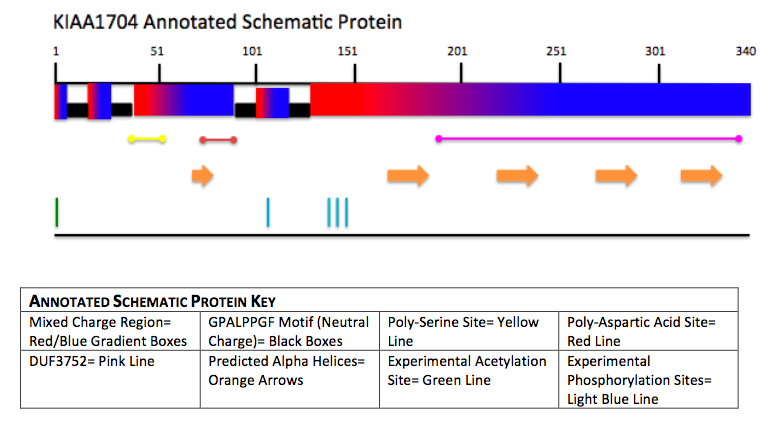
GPALPP1 Annotated Schematic Protein

=== Composition ===
Shown in the table below, GPALPP1 has significantly higher percentages of charged amino acids (D, K, KR, KRED) than the normal human protein and is mostly conserved within its orthologous proteins.

Compositional Analysis	Amino Acid (AA) Abundance H. sapiens	AA Abundance Mus musculus	AA Abundance Gallus gallus	AA Abundance Xenopus tropicales
D++	42 (12.4%)	37 (10.7%)	35 (10%)	33 (9.8%)
V--	6 (1.8%)	9 (2.6%)	9 (2.6%)	-----
K+	37 (10.9%)	37 (10.7%)	-----	-----
L-	17 (5.0%)	17 (4.9%)	19 (5.4%)	-----
KR+	62 (18.2%)	62 (17.9%)	60 (17.1%)	56 (16.6%)
KRED++	134 (39.4%)	135 (39.0%)	135 (38.6%)	122 (36.1%)
ED+	72 (21.2%)	73 (21.1%)	75 (21.4%)	66 (19.5%)
LVIFM-	54 (15.9%)	59 (17.1%)	58 (16.6%)	57 (16.9%)

=== Conservation ===
GPALPP1 has protein orthologs extending through plants, shown in descending order of identity in the table below. Mammals have the highest level of conservation with 89 percent identity followed by birds, frogs, fish, invertebrates, insects, and plants.

Genus and Species	Common name	Accession number	Sequence length (aa)	Sequence identity to Human protein (%) ! !Sequence similarity to Human Protein (%)	Evolutionary Time to Human Divergence (Million years)	
Homo sapiens	Human	NP_061029.2	340	100	100	0
Pan troglodytes	Chimpanzee	XP_509661.2	340	99	100	6.4
Macaca mulatta	Rhesus monkey	XP_001094145	344	97	98	29.2
Loxodonta africana	African savanna elephant	XP_003412655	341	95	98	98.8
Sus scrofa	Wild boar	XP_001924228	346	89	95	92.4
Mus musculus	Mouse	NP_080453.2	346	89	93	94.4
Gallus gallus	Chicken	NP_001006270	350	67	78	371.2
Taeniopygia guttata	Zebra finch	XP_002198724	342	70	81	400.1
Xenopus tropicales	Western clawed frog	NP_001072786	338	62	74	400.1
Xenopus laevis	African clawed frog	NP_001089474	337	61	74	661.2
Danio rerio	Zebrafish	NP_001003473	405	49	61	782.7
Saccoglossus kowalevskii	Acorn worm	XP_002738946	350	43	60	1369
Culex quinquefasciatus	Southern house mosquito	XP_001847636.1	335	41	57	782.7
Drosophila ananassae	Fruit fly	XP_001954135	348	34	50	1215.8
Glycine max	Soybean	XP_003556198	569	32	51	1369
Puccinia graminis	Stem rust	XP_003328471	346	29	46	1215.8

=== Conserved domains ===
Concerning conserved domains, thus far, there does not appear to be much information about conserved motif, GPALPP(GF). This motif represents the neutral segments in this highly charged protein.

DUF3752 is generally found in Eukaryotes and is between 140 and 163 amino acids in length. It belongs to pfam12572, member of superfamily cl13947

GPALPP1 Annotated Charge Multiple Sequence Alignment

Conserved Region	H. sapiens Amino Acid Site	Charge (Acidic, Basic, Neutral)
Poly-serine	41-49	Neutral
Poly-aspartic Acid	81-88	Acidic
GPALPP(GF)	7–14; 32–37; 92–99; 112-119	Neutral
IIGP	110–113; 146-149	Neutral
DUF3752	196-333	Basic (pI=10.51)

Information provided by Statistical Analysis of Proteins (SAPS) tool.

=== Post Translation Modifications ===
GPALPP1 is predicted by ExPASy tools to undergo several conserved post translational modifications including glycation, o-linked glycosylation, serine phosphorylation, threonine phosphorylation, and several kinase specific phosphorylation (PKC, PKA, and CKII).

=== Secondary Structure ===
There are four conserved predicted alpha helices located towards the C terminus of the protein. The N terminus is predicted to be dominated by coiled regions.

=== Subcellular Localization ===
ExPASy PSORT predicts 74% chance of being localized to the nucleus.
