= Mitochondrial apoptosis-induced channel =

Release of cytochrome c through MAC

The mitochondrial apoptosis-induced channel (or MAC), is an early marker of the onset of apoptosis. This ion channel is formed on the outer mitochondrial membrane in response to certain apoptotic stimuli. MAC activity is detected by patch clamping mitochondria from apoptotic cells at the time of cytochrome c release.

Members of the Bcl-2 protein family regulate apoptosis by controlling the formation of MAC: the pro-apoptotic members Bax and/or Bak form MAC, whereas the anti-apoptotic members like Bcl-2 or Bcl-xL prevent MAC formation. Once formed, MAC mediates the release of cytochrome c to the cytosol, triggering the commitment step of the mitochondrial apoptotic cascade. Depletion of MAC activity is accomplished pharmacologically by specific compounds, namely Bax channel inhibitors and MAC inhibitors. Either by knocking down MAC's main components or by its pharmacological inhibition, the end result is prevention of cytochrome c release and apoptosis.
