= BCL2L10 =

Protein-coding gene in the species Homo sapiens

Identifiers
- Aliases: BCL2L10, BCL-B, Boo, Diva, bcl2-L-10, BCL2 like 10
- External IDs: OMIM: 606910; MGI: 1330841; GeneCards: BCL2L10
Available structures
PDB	Ortholog search: PDBe RCSB
PDB	List of PDB id codes 4B4S

Gene location (Human)
Chr.	Chromosome 15 (human)
Band	15q21.2	Start	52,109,263 bp
Band	15q21.2	End	52,112,775 bp

Gene location (Mouse)
Chr.	Chromosome 9 (mouse)
Band	9|9 D	Start	75,255,040 bp
Band	9|9 D	End	75,258,931 bp
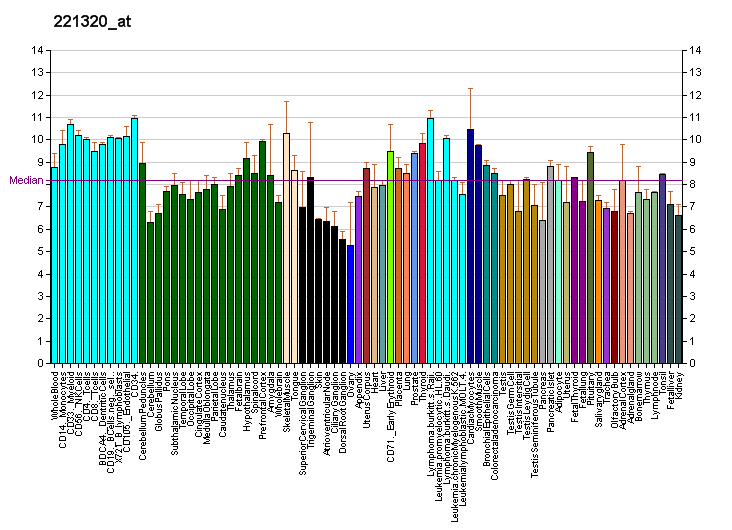
RNA expression pattern
Bgee	Human / Mouse (ortholog); Top expressed in: right lobe of liver; skin of abdomen; skin of leg; right adrenal gland; right adrenal cortex; left adrenal gland; mucosa of esophagus; human kidney; left adrenal cortex; nucleus accumbens / Top expressed in: secondary oocyte; blastocyst; primary oocyte; zygote; meninges; morula; ovary; cumulus cell; white adipose tissue; subcutaneous adipose tissue; More reference expression data
BioGPS	More reference expression data
Gene ontology
Molecular function	protein binding; caspase binding; protein homodimerization activity; protein heterodimerization activity
Cellular component	nucleus; integral component of membrane; cytosol; nuclear membrane; mitochondrion; membrane; mitochondrial outer membrane
Biological process	apoptotic process; regulation of apoptotic process; negative regulation of apoptotic process; activation of cysteine-type endopeptidase activity involved in apoptotic process; female gamete generation; spermatogenesis; intrinsic apoptotic signaling pathway in response to DNA damage; extrinsic apoptotic signaling pathway in absence of ligand; negative regulation of intrinsic apoptotic signaling pathway
Sources:Amigo / QuickGO
Orthologs
Databases	NCBI: entry; OMA: entry
Species	Human	Mouse
Entrez	10017	12049
Ensembl	ENSG00000137875	ENSMUSG00000032191
UniProt	Q9HD36	Q9Z0F3
RefSeq (mRNA)	NM_001306168; NM_020396	NM_013479
RefSeq (protein)	NP_001293097; NP_065129	NP_038507
Location (UCSC)	Chr 15: 52.11 – 52.11 Mb	Chr 9: 75.26 – 75.26 Mb
PubMed search
- Wikidata
View/Edit Human	View/Edit Mouse

Bcl-2-like protein 10 is a protein that in humans is encoded by the BCL2L10 gene.

The protein encoded by this gene belongs to the BCL-2 protein family. BCL-2 family members form hetero- or homodimers and act as anti- or pro-apoptotic regulators that are involved in a wide variety of cellular activities. The protein encoded by this gene contains conserved BH4, BH1 and BH2 domains. This protein can interact with other members of BCL-2 protein family including BCL2, BCL2L1/BCL-X(L), and BAX. Overexpression of this gene has been shown to suppress cell apoptosis possibly through the prevention of cytochrome C release from the mitochondria, and thus preventing caspase-3 activation. The mouse counterpart of this protein is found to interact with Apaf1 and forms a protein complex with Caspase 9, which suggests the involvement of this protein in APAF1 and CASP9 related apoptotic pathway.
