= BCL2L13 =

Protein-coding gene in the species Homo sapiens

Identifiers
- Aliases: BCL2L13, BCL-RAMBO, Bcl2-L-13, MIL1, BCL2 like 13
- External IDs: MGI: 2136959; GeneCards: BCL2L13
Available structures
PDB	Ortholog search: PDBe RCSB
PDB	List of PDB id codes 2IPD

Gene location (Human)
Chr.	Chromosome 22 (human)
Band	22q11.21	Start	17,628,855 bp
Band	22q11.21	End	17,730,855 bp

Gene location (Mouse)
Chr.	Chromosome 6 (mouse)
Band	6 F1|6 57.01 cM	Start	120,813,173 bp
Band	6 F1|6 57.01 cM	End	120,869,803 bp
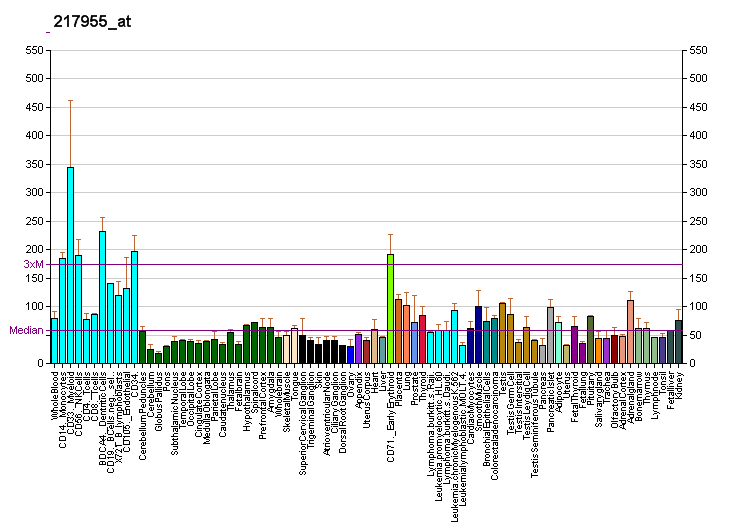
RNA expression pattern
Bgee	Human / Mouse (ortholog); Top expressed in: secondary oocyte; gastrocnemius muscle; middle temporal gyrus; muscle of thigh; glutes; Skeletal muscle tissue of rectus abdominis; islet of Langerhans; Brodmann area 23; tibialis anterior muscle; deltoid muscle / Top expressed in: corneal stroma; lens; muscle of thigh; plantaris muscle; epithelium of lens; soleus muscle; digastric muscle; triceps brachii muscle; yolk sac; extensor digitorum longus muscle; More reference expression data
BioGPS	More reference expression data
Gene ontology
Molecular function	cysteine-type endopeptidase activator activity involved in apoptotic process; protein binding
Cellular component	integral component of membrane; mitochondrial membranes; nucleus; membrane; mitochondrion
Biological process	regulation of apoptotic process; activation of cysteine-type endopeptidase activity involved in apoptotic process; apoptotic process
Sources:Amigo / QuickGO
Orthologs
Databases	NCBI: entry; OMA: entry
Species	Human	Mouse
Entrez	23786	94044
Ensembl	ENSG00000099968	ENSMUSG00000009112
UniProt	Q9BXK5	P59017
RefSeq (mRNA)	NM_001270726; NM_001270727; NM_001270728; NM_001270729; NM_001270730 NM_001270731; NM_001270732; NM_001270733; NM_001270734; NM_001270735; NM_015367; NM_001363824	NM_153516
RefSeq (protein)	NP_001257655; NP_001257656; NP_001257657; NP_001257658; NP_001257659 NP_001257660; NP_001257661; NP_001257662; NP_001257663; NP_001257664; NP_056182; NP_001350753	NP_705736
Location (UCSC)	Chr 22: 17.63 – 17.73 Mb	Chr 6: 120.81 – 120.87 Mb
PubMed search
- Wikidata
View/Edit Human	View/Edit Mouse

BCL2-like 13 (apoptosis facilitator), also known as BCL2L13 or Bcl-rambo, is a protein which in humans is encoded by the BCL2L13 gene on chromosome 22. This gene encodes a mitochondrially-localized protein which is classified under the Bcl-2 protein family. Overexpression of the encoded protein results in apoptosis. As a result, it has been implicated in cancers such as childhood acute lymphoblastic leukemia (ALL) and glioblastoma multiforme (GBM). Alternatively spliced transcript variants have been observed for this gene, such as Bcl-rambo beta.

== Structure ==
As a member of the Bcl-2 protein family, Bcl-rambo comprises four conserved BH domains and a transmembrane (TM) domain. However, unlike the other members, Bcl-rambo does not require the BH domains for its apoptotic function, relying instead on the mitochondrial localization carried out by the TM domain. In addition to these domains, it has conserved B-cell lymphoma 2 homology motifs, as well as an extension at its c-terminal, termed the BHNo domain, which contains two tandem repeats, RTA and RTB.

An alternatively-spliced protein variant, called Bcl-rambo beta, is composed of only the BH4 domain, completely lacking the BH domains 1 through 3 due to an in-frame stop codon inserted by an Alu element. Without the TM domain, this variant remains in the cytosol and does not localize to the mitochondria. Nonetheless, it still performs proapoptotic activity, mediated by the encoded Alu element, though the exact mechanisms remain to be elucidated.

== Function ==
Bcl-rambo is a member of the Bcl-2 family of proteins that regulate apoptosis. In cells, Bcl-rambo is localized to the mitochondria, and its overexpression induces apoptosis that is blocked by caspase inhibitors, whereas inhibitors controlling upstream events of either the 'death receptor' (FLIP, FADD-DN) or the 'mitochondrial' pro-apoptotic pathway (Bcl-x(L)) had no effect. Bcl-rambo mediates apoptosis by associating with adenine nucleotide translocator (ANT), a component of the mitochondrial permeability transition pore, to induce its opening. ANT will also facilitate the transfer of ADP and ATP between the cytosol and the matrix.

== Clinical significance ==
The BCL2L13 gene has been implicated in a wide spectrum of cancers. Previous clinical studies observed in ALL patients that high expression of BCL2L13 correlated to lower event-free and overall survival. Though statistically significant, the observations contradict the accepted pro-apoptotic function of BCL2L13’s gene product, which should have contributed to cancer cell death and, thus, more favorable survival outcomes. Two possible explanations propose that either 1) Bcl-rambo performs a different biological role in childhood, or 2) alternative splicing could have generated an anti-apoptotic variant. More research is necessary to resolve this discrepancy. In another type of cancer, GBM, Bcl-rambo is known to inhibit induced apoptosis in GBM cells by binding two other pro-apoptotic proteins, ceramide synthases 2 (CerS2) and 6 (CerS6), thereby blocking CerS2/6 complex formation and activity. Thus, inhibiting BCL2L13 during cancer treatments may improve survival outcomes.

== Interactions ==
BCL2L13 has been shown to interact with:

- CerS2 and
- CerS6.
