= DAD1 =

Type of enzyme

Identifiers
- Aliases: DAD1, OST2, defender against cell death 1
- External IDs: OMIM: 600243; MGI: 101912; GeneCards: DAD1

Gene location (Human)
Chr.	Chromosome 14 (human)
Band	14q11.2	Start	22,564,907 bp
Band	14q11.2	End	22,589,224 bp

Gene location (Mouse)
Chr.	Chromosome 14 (mouse)
Band	14 C2|14 27.7 cM	Start	54,472,936 bp
Band	14 C2|14 27.7 cM	End	54,491,561 bp
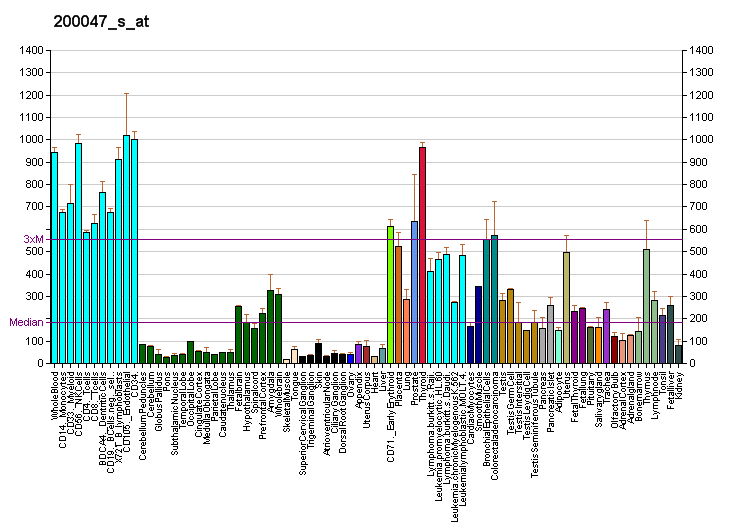
RNA expression pattern
Bgee	Human / Mouse (ortholog); Top expressed in: islet of Langerhans; gallbladder; right lobe of thyroid gland; anterior pituitary; left lobe of thyroid gland; right adrenal gland; canal of the cervix; rectum; left adrenal gland; stromal cell of endometrium / Top expressed in: choroid plexus of fourth ventricle; facial motor nucleus; seminal vesicula; islet of Langerhans; fossa; internal carotid artery; efferent ductule; adrenal gland; external carotid artery; carotid body; More reference expression data
BioGPS	More reference expression data
Gene ontology
Molecular function	dolichyl-diphosphooligosaccharide-protein glycotransferase activity; oligosaccharyl transferase activity
Cellular component	integral component of membrane; oligosaccharyltransferase complex; extracellular exosome; endoplasmic reticulum membrane; membrane; endoplasmic reticulum
Biological process	protein glycosylation; negative regulation of apoptotic process; protein N-linked glycosylation via asparagine; blastocyst development; response to nutrient; apoptotic process; protein N-linked glycosylation
Sources:Amigo / QuickGO
Orthologs
Databases	NCBI: entry; OMA: entry
Species	Human	Mouse
Entrez	1603	13135
Ensembl	ENSG00000129562	ENSMUSG00000022174
UniProt	P61803	P61804
RefSeq (mRNA)	NM_001344	NM_001113358; NM_010015
RefSeq (protein)	NP_001335	NP_001106829; NP_034145
Location (UCSC)	Chr 14: 22.56 – 22.59 Mb	Chr 14: 54.47 – 54.49 Mb
PubMed search
- Wikidata
View/Edit Human	View/Edit Mouse

Dolichyl-diphosphooligosaccharide—protein glycosyltransferase subunit DAD1 is an enzyme that in humans is encoded by the DAD1 gene.

== Function ==
DAD1, the defender against apoptotic cell death, was initially identified as a negative regulator of programmed cell death in the temperature sensitive tsBN7 cell line. The DAD1 protein disappeared in temperature-sensitive cells following a shift to the nonpermissive temperature, suggesting that loss of the DAD1 protein triggered apoptosis. DAD1 is believed to be a tightly associated subunit of oligosaccharyltransferase both in the intact membrane and in the purified enzyme, thus reflecting the essential nature of N-linked glycosylation in eukaryotes.

== Interactions ==
DAD1 has been shown to interact with MCL1.
