= MCL1 =

Protein-coding gene in humans

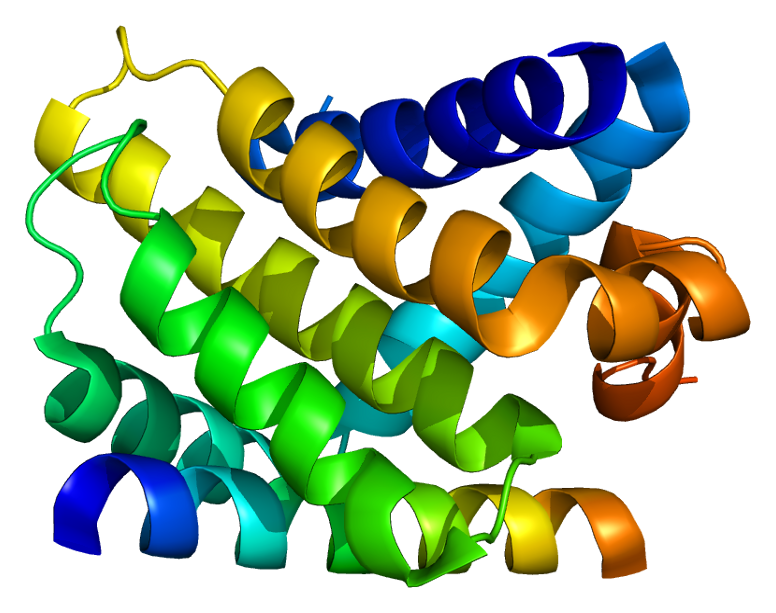

Identifiers
- Aliases: MCL1, BCL2L3, EAT, MCL1-ES, MCL1L, MCL1S, Mcl-1, TM, bcl2-L-3, mcl1/EAT, myeloid cell leukemia 1, BCL2 family apoptosis regulator, BCL2 family apoptosis regulator, MCL1 apoptosis regulator, BCL2 family member
- External IDs: OMIM: 159552; MGI: 101769; GeneCards: MCL1
Available structures
PDB	Ortholog search: PDBe RCSB
PDB	List of PDB id codes 2KBW, 2MHS, 2NL9, 2NLA, 2PQK, 3D7V, 3IO9, 3KJ0, 3KJ1, 3KJ2, 3KZ0, 3MK8, 3PK1, 3TWU, 3WIX, 3WIY, 4BPI, 4BPJ, 4HW2, 4HW3, 4HW4, 4OQ5, 4OQ6, 4WGI, 4WMR, 4WMS, 4WMT, 4WMU, 4WMV, 4WMW, 4WMX, 4ZBF, 4ZBI, 5FDO, 5FDR, 5FC4, 5C3F

Gene location (Human)
Chr.	Chromosome 1 (human)
Band	1q21.2	Start	150,560,895 bp
Band	1q21.2	End	150,579,738 bp

Gene location (Mouse)
Chr.	Chromosome 3 (mouse)
Band	3 F2.1|3 40.74 cM	Start	95,566,099 bp
Band	3 F2.1|3 40.74 cM	End	95,570,487 bp
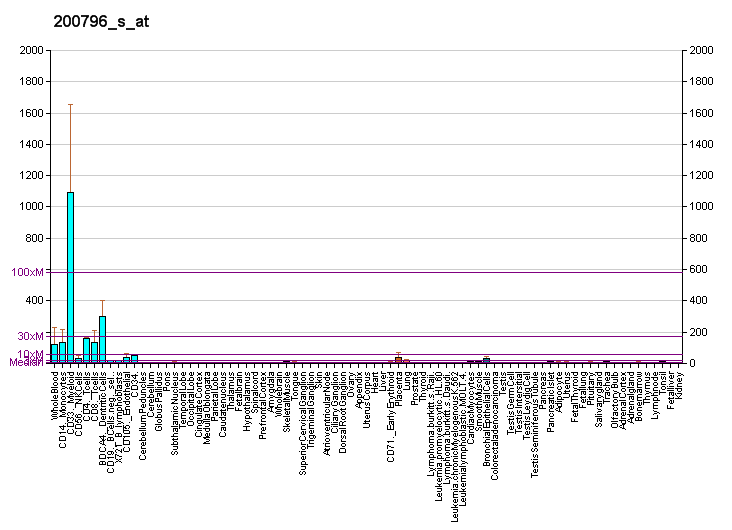

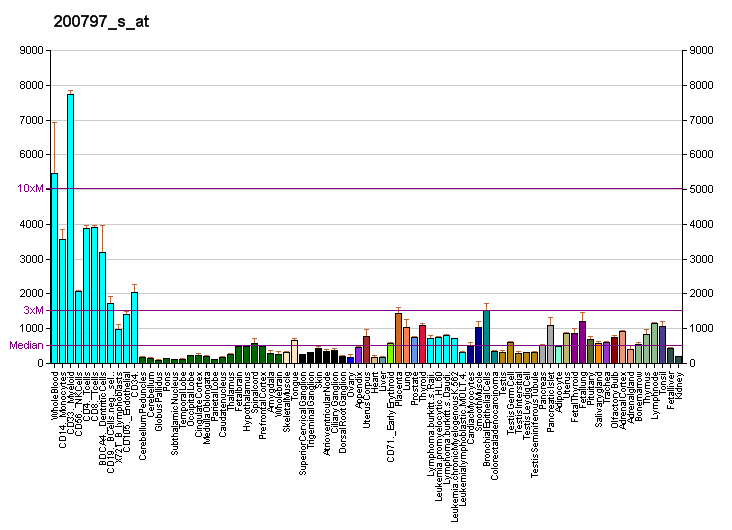

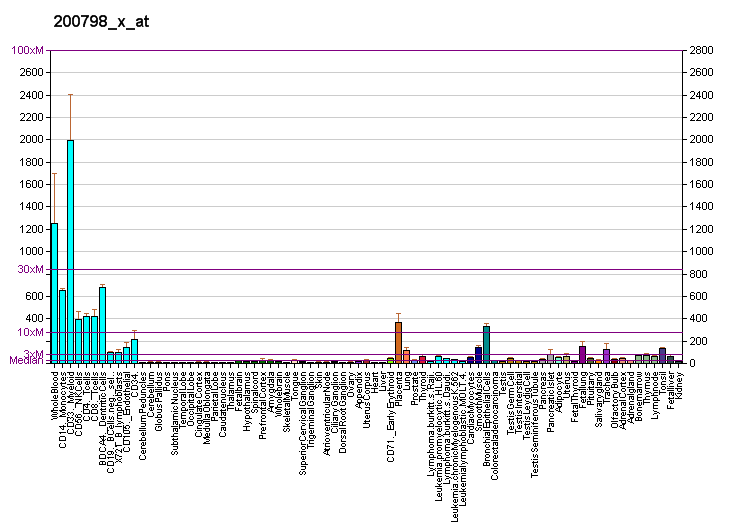
RNA expression pattern
Bgee	Human / Mouse (ortholog); Top expressed in: visceral pleura; parietal pleura; mucosa of urinary bladder; saphenous vein; Epithelium of choroid plexus; epithelium of nasopharynx; mononuclear cell; monocyte; cardia; gallbladder / Top expressed in: otic placode; saccule; stroma of bone marrow; mesenteric lymph nodes; granulocyte; left colon; conjunctival fornix; blood; right lung lobe; left lung; More reference expression data
BioGPS	More reference expression data
Gene ontology
Molecular function	BH3 domain binding; protein binding; protein heterodimerization activity; protein homodimerization activity; protein transmembrane transporter activity
Cellular component	cytoplasm; integral component of membrane; membrane; Bcl-2 family protein complex; nucleoplasm; mitochondrial outer membrane; mitochondrial matrix; mitochondrion; nucleus; cytosol
Biological process	regulation of apoptotic process; cell differentiation; response to cytokine; cellular homeostasis; multicellular organism development; positive regulation of oxidative stress-induced neuron intrinsic apoptotic signaling pathway; apoptotic mitochondrial changes; extrinsic apoptotic signaling pathway in absence of ligand; cell fate determination; regulation of response to DNA damage stimulus; negative regulation of extrinsic apoptotic signaling pathway in absence of ligand; negative regulation of anoikis; apoptotic process; negative regulation of apoptotic process; protein transmembrane transport; negative regulation of autophagy; intrinsic apoptotic signaling pathway in response to DNA damage; negative regulation of intrinsic apoptotic signaling pathway; cytokine-mediated signaling pathway
Sources:Amigo / QuickGO
Orthologs
Databases	NCBI: entry; OMA: entry
Species	Human	Mouse
Entrez	4170	17210
Ensembl	ENSG00000143384	ENSMUSG00000038612
UniProt	Q07820	P97287
RefSeq (mRNA)	NM_182763; NM_001197320; NM_021960	NM_008562
RefSeq (protein)	NP_001184249; NP_068779; NP_877495	NP_032588
Location (UCSC)	Chr 1: 150.56 – 150.58 Mb	Chr 3: 95.57 – 95.57 Mb
PubMed search
- Wikidata
View/Edit Human	View/Edit Mouse

Induced myeloid leukemia cell differentiation protein Mcl-1 is a protein that in humans is encoded by the MCL1 gene.

== Function ==
The protein encoded by this gene belongs to the Bcl-2 family. Alternative splicing occurs at this locus and two transcript variants encoding distinct isoforms have been identified. The longer gene product (isoform 1) enhances cell survival by inhibiting apoptosis while the alternatively spliced shorter gene product (isoform 2) promotes apoptosis and is death-inducing. The protein MCL1 has a very short biological half-life of only 20–30 minutes.

The loss of MCL1 has a more dramatic impact than the loss of any other anti-apoptotic member of the Bcl-2 family. Loss of the Mcl-1 gene results in embryo death when the embryo is only around 3.5 days old, before it has even implanted. Conditional deletion of Mcl-1 depletes a wide variety of cells, including hematopoietic stem cells, B cell–committed progenitors, T cell–committed progenitors, antibody-secreting plasma cells, cardiac muscle cells, and neurons. Deletion of Mcl-1 in hepatocytes causes apoptosis and aberrant polyploidization but improves liver regeneration after surgery. MCL1 works synergistically with p53 in protecting liver from injury, fibrosis and cancer.

MCL1 also has a role in the cell's energy production, working in the intermitochondrial space.

== Clinical significance ==
Omacetaxine mepesuccinate (a drug approved for the treatment for chronic myelogenous leukemia) and Seliciclib (which is under investigation as a potential multiple myeloma treatment) both act in part by inhibiting synthesis of Mcl-1. MCL1 has been identified as a resistance factor for BCL-2 inhibitor venetoclax in lymphoma cells. Therefore, new strategies of combining BCL-2 and MCL1 inhibitors are currently under clinical trials for several tumor types.

== Interactions ==
MCL1 has been shown to promiscuously interact with:

- BAK1,
- BCL2L11, commonly called BIM,
- BID,
- BAD,
- DAD1,
- PMAIP1, commonly called NOXA,
- PCNA,
- PUMA,
- TCTP and
- TNKS

== See also ==
- Bcl-2
- Bcl-xL
