= BH3 interacting-domain death agonist =

Protein-coding gene in the species Homo sapiens

BID
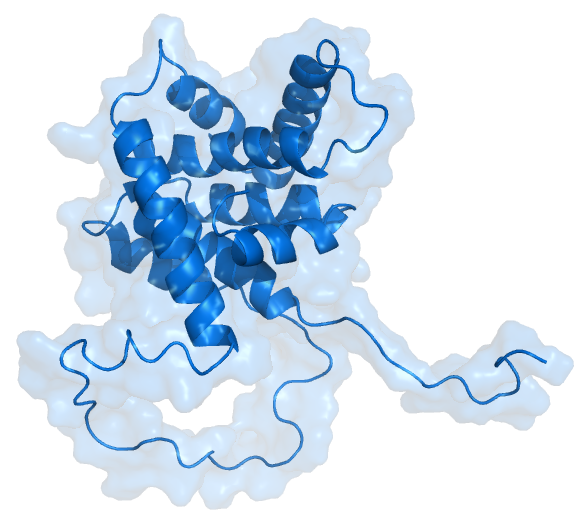

Identifiers
- Aliases: BID, Bid, 2700049M22Rik, AI875481, AU022477, FP497, BH3 interacting domain death agonist
- External IDs: OMIM: 601997; MGI: 108093; GeneCards: BID
Available structures
PDB	Ortholog search: PDBe RCSB
PDB	List of PDB id codes 1ZY3, 2BID, 2KBW, 2M5B, 2M5I, 4BD2, 4ZEQ, 5AJJ, 4QVE, 4ZIG, 4ZII, 5C3F

Gene location (Human)
Chr.	Chromosome 22 (human)
Band	22q11.21	Start	17,734,138 bp
Band	22q11.21	End	17,774,770 bp

Gene location (Mouse)
Chr.	Chromosome 6 (mouse)
Band	6 F1|6 57.02 cM	Start	120,868,891 bp
Band	6 F1|6 57.02 cM	End	120,893,814 bp
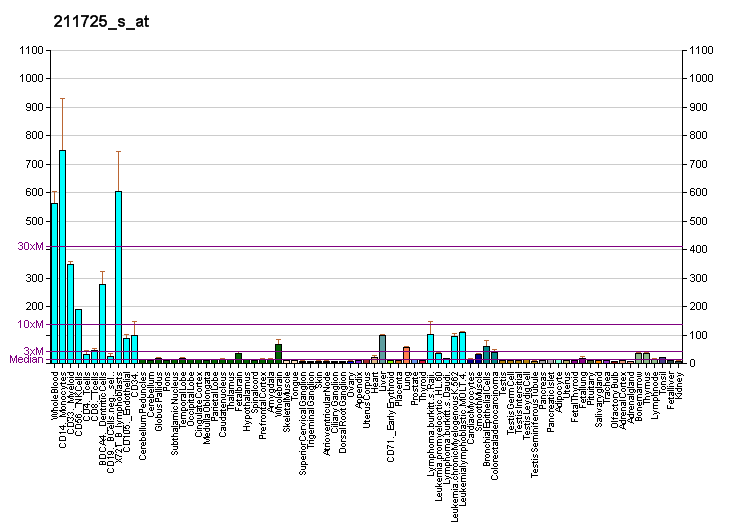

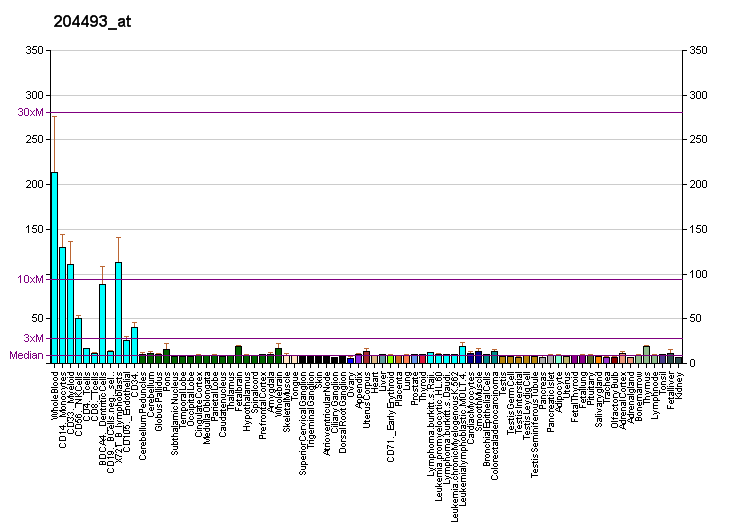
RNA expression pattern
Bgee	Human / Mouse (ortholog); Top expressed in: monocyte; blood; granulocyte; pancreatic ductal cell; bone marrow; right frontal lobe; bone marrow cell; prefrontal cortex; periodontal fiber; mucosa of transverse colon / Top expressed in: lumbar spinal ganglion; granulocyte; otic placode; saccule; stroma of bone marrow; right kidney; human kidney; otic vesicle; proximal tubule; blood; More reference expression data
BioGPS	More reference expression data
Gene ontology
Molecular function	death receptor binding; protein binding; ubiquitin protein ligase binding; protein heterodimerization activity
Cellular component	cytoplasm; membrane; mitochondrial membranes; mitochondrial outer membrane; mitochondrion; integral component of mitochondrial membrane; cytosol
Biological process	neuron apoptotic process; positive regulation of protein homooligomerization; positive regulation of mitochondrial outer membrane permeabilization involved in apoptotic signaling pathway; extrinsic apoptotic signaling pathway; signal transduction in response to DNA damage; regulation of protein oligomerization; establishment of protein localization to membrane; protein targeting to mitochondrion; regulation of mitochondrial membrane permeability involved in apoptotic process; regulation of G1/S transition of mitotic cell cycle; positive regulation of protein insertion into mitochondrial membrane involved in apoptotic signaling pathway; regulation of cell population proliferation; apoptotic mitochondrial changes; positive regulation of protein oligomerization; positive regulation of apoptotic process; positive regulation of release of cytochrome c from mitochondria; positive regulation of extrinsic apoptotic signaling pathway; protein homooligomerization; activation of cysteine-type endopeptidase activity involved in apoptotic process; mitochondrial outer membrane permeabilization; extrinsic apoptotic signaling pathway via death domain receptors; hepatocyte apoptotic process; release of cytochrome c from mitochondria; apoptotic process; regulation of apoptotic process; positive regulation of mitochondrial membrane potential; mitochondrial ATP synthesis coupled electron transport; negative regulation of intrinsic apoptotic signaling pathway in response to DNA damage; positive regulation of fibroblast apoptotic process; positive regulation of apoptotic signaling pathway; negative regulation of apoptotic process; positive regulation of intrinsic apoptotic signaling pathway
Sources:Amigo / QuickGO
Orthologs
Databases	NCBI: entry; OMA: entry
Species	Human	Mouse
Entrez	637	12122
Ensembl	ENSG00000015475	ENSMUSG00000004446
UniProt	P55957	P70444
RefSeq (mRNA)	NM_001196; NM_001244567; NM_001244569; NM_001244570; NM_001244572 NM_197966; NM_197967	NM_007544
RefSeq (protein)	NP_001187; NP_001231496; NP_001231498; NP_001231499; NP_001231501 NP_932070; NP_932071; NP_001187.1; NP_001231496.1	NP_031570
Location (UCSC)	Chr 22: 17.73 – 17.77 Mb	Chr 6: 120.87 – 120.89 Mb
PubMed search
- Wikidata
View/Edit Human	View/Edit Mouse

BID
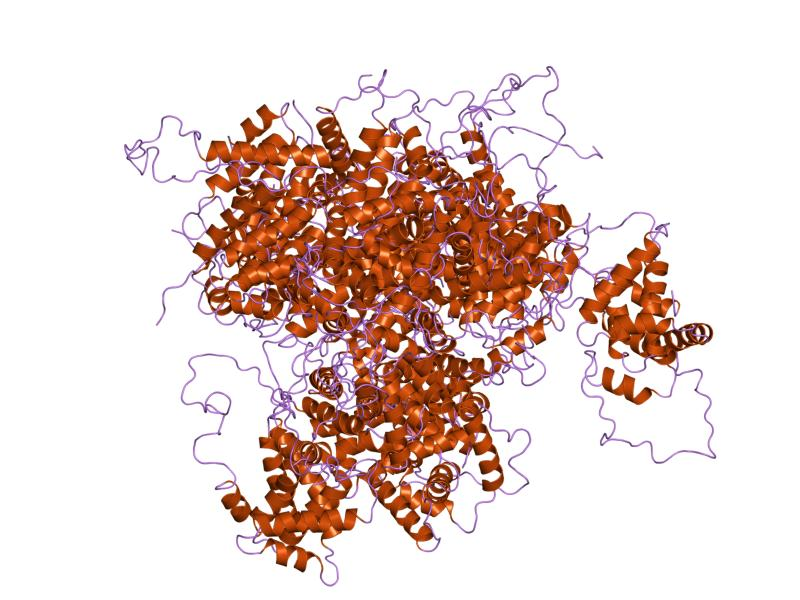
- human pro-apoptotic protein bid

Identifiers
- Symbol: BID
- Pfam: PF06393
- InterPro: IPR010479
- SCOP2: 1ddb / SCOPe / SUPFAM
- TCDB: 1.A.21
- OPM superfamily: 40
- OPM protein: 2m5i
Available protein structures:
- PDB: IPR010479 PF06393 (ECOD; PDBsum)
- AlphaFold: IPR010479; PF06393

The BH3 interacting-domain death agonist, or BID, gene is a pro-apoptotic member of the Bcl-2 protein family. Bcl-2 family members share one or more of the four characteristic domains of homology entitled the Bcl-2 homology (BH) domains (named BH1, BH2, BH3 and BH4), and can form hetero- or homodimers. Bcl-2 proteins act as anti- or pro-apoptotic regulators that are involved in a wide variety of cellular activities.

== Interactions ==
BID is a pro-apoptotic Bcl-2 protein containing only the BH3 domain. In response to apoptotic signaling, BID interacts with another Bcl-2 family protein, Bax, leading to the insertion of Bax into organelle membranes, primarily the outer mitochondrial membrane. Bax is believed to interact with, and induce the opening of the mitochondrial voltage-dependent anion channel, VDAC. Alternatively, growing evidence suggest that activated Bax and/or Bak form an oligomeric pore, MAC in the outer membrane. This results in the release of cytochrome c and other pro-apoptotic factors (such as SMAC/DIABLO) from the mitochondria, often referred to as mitochondrial outer membrane permeabilization, leading to activation of caspases (not to be confused with capsaicin). This defines BID as a direct activator of Bax, a role common to some of the pro-apoptotic Bcl-2 proteins containing only the BH3 domain.

The anti-apoptotic Bcl-2 proteins, including Bcl-2 itself, can bind BID and inhibit BID's ability to activate Bax. As a result, the anti-apoptotic Bcl-2 proteins may inhibit apoptosis by sequestering BID, leading to reduced Bax activation.

The expression of BID is upregulated by the tumor suppressor p53, and BID has been shown to be involved in p53-mediated apoptosis. The p53 protein is a transcription factor that, when activated as part of the cell's response to stress, regulates many downstream target genes, including BID. However, p53 also has a transcription-independent role in apoptosis. In particular, p53 interacts with Bax, promoting Bax activation and the insertion of Bax into the mitochondrial membrane.

The BH3 interacting-domain death agonist has been shown to interact with:

- ATR/ATRIP,
- BCL2,
- CASP2,
- CASP8,
- MCL1, and
- RPA.

== Cleavage ==
Caspase-8 (as surface) cleavage of Bid (as ribbon) (visualization by Kosi Gramatikoff)

Several reports have demonstrated that caspase-8, and its substrate BID, are frequently activated in response to certain apoptotic stimuli in a death receptor-independent manner. N-hydroxy-L-arginine (NOHA), a stable intermediate product formed during the conversion of L-arginine to nitric oxide activates caspase-8. Activation of caspase-8, and subsequent BID cleavage participate in cytochrome-c mediated apoptosis. 1-methyl-4-phenyl-1,2,3,6-tetrahydropyridine (MPTP) mediated activation of caspase-9 via cytochrome-c release has been shown to result in the activation of caspase-8 and Bid cleavage. Aspirin and Curcumin (diferuloylmethane) too activate caspase-8 to cleave and translocate Bid, induced a conformational change in and translocation of Bax and cytochrome-c release.

== See also ==
- Apoptosis
- Apoptosome
- Bcl-2
- Bcl-2-associated X protein (BAX)
- Caspases
- Cytochrome c
- Noxa
- Mitochondrion
- p53 upregulated modulator of apoptosis (PUMA)
