= Apoptosis regulator BAX =

Mammalian protein found in Homo sapiens

BAX
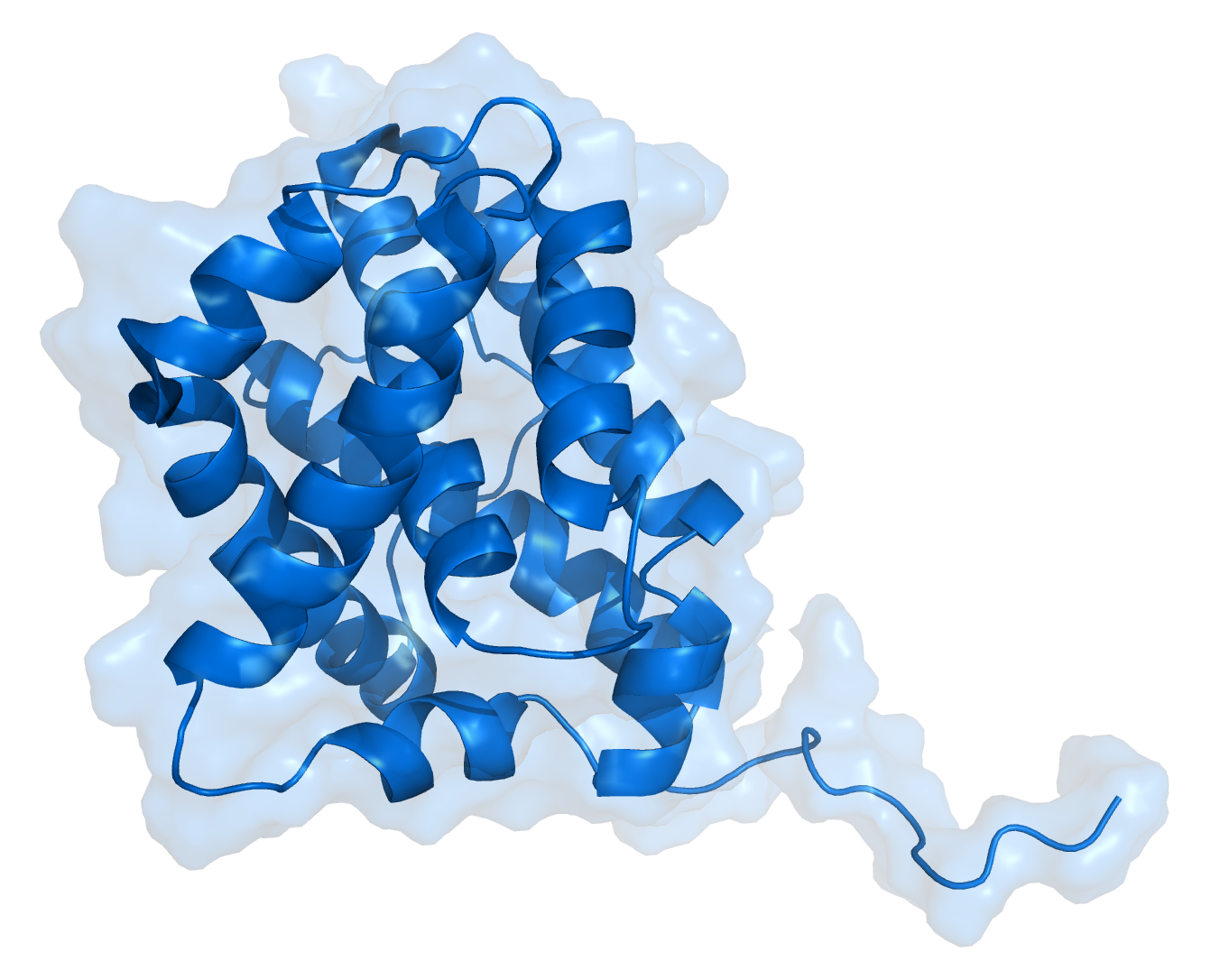

Identifiers
- Aliases: BAX, BCL2L4, BCL2 associated X protein, BCL2 associated X, apoptosis regulator
- External IDs: OMIM: 600040; MGI: 99702; GeneCards: BAX
Available structures
PDB	Ortholog search: PDBe RCSB
PDB	List of PDB id codes 4BDU, 1F16, 2G5B, 2K7W, 2LR1, 3PK1, 3PL7, 4BD2, 4BD6, 4BD7, 4BD8, 4UF2, 4ZIE, 4ZIF, 4ZIG, 4ZIH, 4ZII, 4S0O

Gene location (Human)
Chr.	Chromosome 19 (human)
Band	19q13.33	Start	48,954,815 bp
Band	19q13.33	End	48,961,798 bp

Gene location (Mouse)
Chr.	Chromosome 7 (mouse)
Band	7 B3|7 29.32 cM	Start	45,111,121 bp
Band	7 B3|7 29.32 cM	End	45,116,322 bp
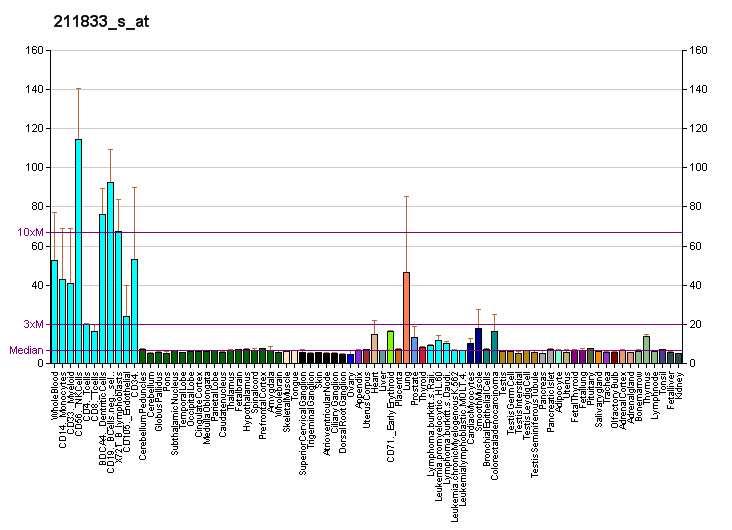

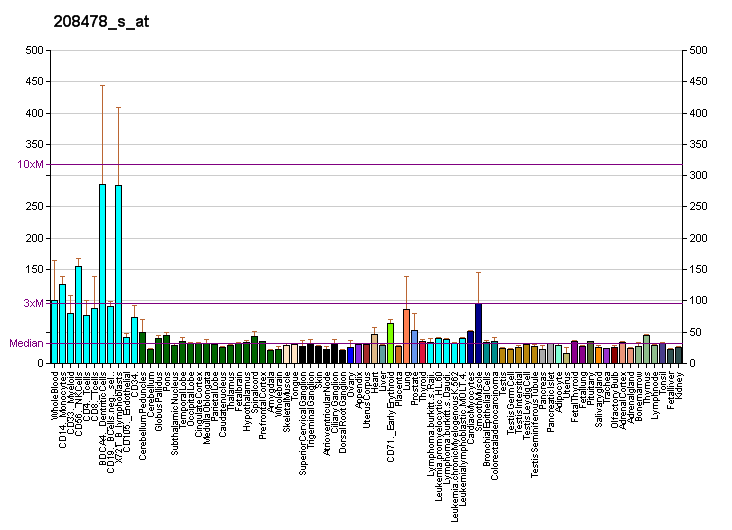
RNA expression pattern
Bgee	Human / Mouse (ortholog); Top expressed in: mucosa of transverse colon; stromal cell of endometrium; granulocyte; monocyte; gallbladder; right lung; rectum; upper lobe of left lung; spleen; ascending aorta / Top expressed in: embryo; epiblast; embryo; yolk sac; ventricular zone; neural tube; stroma of bone marrow; calvaria; ganglionic eminence; right kidney; More reference expression data
BioGPS	More reference expression data
Gene ontology
Molecular function	protein homodimerization activity; channel activity; protein binding; BH3 domain binding; chaperone binding; protein heterodimerization activity; identical protein binding; lipid binding; Hsp70 protein binding
Cellular component	cytosol; nuclear envelope; membrane; Bcl-2 family protein complex; mitochondrion; nucleus; mitochondrial permeability transition pore complex; mitochondrial membranes; BAX complex; endoplasmic reticulum; extracellular exosome; pore complex; integral component of membrane; intracellular anatomical structure; endoplasmic reticulum membrane; cytoplasm; mitochondrial outer membrane; cell periphery
Biological process	negative regulation of neuron apoptotic process; response to ionizing radiation; germ cell development; positive regulation of calcium ion transport into cytosol; glycosphingolipid metabolic process; B cell apoptotic process; response to salt stress; Sertoli cell proliferation; thymocyte apoptotic process; T cell homeostatic proliferation; post-embryonic development; regulation of mitochondrial membrane permeability involved in apoptotic process; negative regulation of protein binding; cellular response to DNA damage stimulus; regulation of mitochondrial membrane permeability involved in programmed necrotic cell death; odontogenesis of dentin-containing tooth; positive regulation of extrinsic apoptotic signaling pathway in absence of ligand; positive regulation of IRE1-mediated unfolded protein response; blood vessel remodeling; positive regulation of neuron apoptotic process; apoptotic process involved in blood vessel morphogenesis; activation of cysteine-type endopeptidase activity involved in apoptotic process by cytochrome c; spermatogenesis; apoptotic signaling pathway; cell population proliferation; mitochondrion morphogenesis; activation of cysteine-type endopeptidase activity involved in apoptotic process; negative regulation of cell population proliferation; cellular response to organic substance; B cell homeostatic proliferation; limb morphogenesis; release of matrix enzymes from mitochondria; extrinsic apoptotic signaling pathway; kidney development; activation of cysteine-type endopeptidase activity involved in apoptotic signaling pathway; negative regulation of apoptotic signaling pathway; myeloid cell homeostasis; regulation of neuron apoptotic process; regulation of cysteine-type endopeptidase activity involved in apoptotic process; endoplasmic reticulum calcium ion homeostasis; response to wounding; intrinsic apoptotic signaling pathway by p53 class mediator; hypothalamus development; viral process; protein homooligomerization; response to gamma radiation; negative regulation of fibroblast proliferation; positive regulation of intrinsic apoptotic signaling pathway; response to toxic substance; B cell negative selection; mitochondrial fusion; neuron apoptotic process; male gonad development; positive regulation of B cell apoptotic process; regulation of protein heterodimerization activity; positive regulation of mitochondrial outer membrane permeabilization involved in apoptotic signaling pathway; cellular response to UV; sex differentiation; neuron migration; B cell homeostasis; positive regulation of release of sequestered calcium ion into cytosol; positive regulation of apoptotic process involved in mammary gland involution; nervous system development; spermatid differentiation; development of secondary sexual characteristics; positive regulation of developmental pigmentation; retina development in camera-type eye; response to axon injury; positive regulation of mitochondrial membrane permeability involved in apoptotic process; cerebral cortex development; ovarian follicle development; fertilization; ectopic germ cell programmed cell death; homeostasis of number of cells within a tissue; positive regulation of release of cytochrome c from mitochondria; B cell receptor apoptotic signaling pathway; negative regulation of endoplasmic reticulum calcium ion concentration; regulation of protein homodimerization activity; apoptotic process involved in embryonic digit morphogenesis; leukocyte homeostasis; positive regulation of apoptotic DNA fragmentation; mitochondrial fragmentation involved in apoptotic process; positive regulation of endoplasmic reticulum unfolded protein response; establishment or maintenance of transmembrane electrochemical gradient; homeostasis of number of cells; vagina development; post-embryonic camera-type eye morphogenesis; regulation of mammary gland epithelial cell proliferation; retinal cell programmed cell death; regulation of cell cycle; regulation of mitochondrial membrane potential; intrinsic apoptotic signaling pathway in response to endoplasmic reticulum stress; apoptotic mitochondrial changes; protein complex oligomerization; regulation of nitrogen utilization; negative regulation of peptidyl-serine phosphorylation; positive regulation of apoptotic process; positive regulation of protein oligomerization; extrinsic apoptotic signaling pathway via death domain receptors; release of cytochrome c from mitochondria; apoptotic process; protein insertion into mitochondrial membrane involved in apoptotic signaling pathway; intrinsic apoptotic signaling pathway; regulation of apoptotic process; DNA damage response, signal transduction by p53 class mediator resulting in cell cycle arrest; intrinsic apoptotic signaling pathway in response to DNA damage; extrinsic apoptotic signaling pathway in absence of ligand; transcription initiation from RNA polymerase II promoter; Unfolded protein response; negative regulation of mitochondrial membrane potential
Sources:Amigo / QuickGO
Orthologs
Databases	NCBI: entry; OMA: entry
Species	Human	Mouse
Entrez	581	12028
Ensembl	ENSG00000087088	ENSMUSG00000003873
UniProt	Q07812; Q5ZPJ0	Q07813
RefSeq (mRNA)	NM_001291428; NM_001291429; NM_001291430; NM_001291431; NM_004324 NM_138761; NM_138762; NM_138763; NM_138764	NM_007527
RefSeq (protein)	NP_001278357; NP_001278358; NP_001278359; NP_001278360; NP_004315 NP_620116; NP_620118; NP_620119; NP_001278358.1	NP_031553
Location (UCSC)	Chr 19: 48.95 – 48.96 Mb	Chr 7: 45.11 – 45.12 Mb
PubMed search
- Wikidata
View/Edit Human	View/Edit Mouse

Apoptosis regulator BAX, also known as bcl-2-like protein 4, is a protein that in humans is encoded by the BAX gene. BAX is a member of the Bcl-2 gene family. BCL2 family members form hetero- or homodimers and act as anti- or pro-apoptotic regulators that are involved in a wide variety of cellular activities. This protein forms a heterodimer with BCL2, and functions as an apoptotic activator. This protein is reported to interact with, and increase the opening of, the mitochondrial voltage-dependent anion channel (VDAC), which leads to the loss in membrane potential and the release of cytochrome c. The expression of this gene is regulated by the tumor suppressor P53 and has been shown to be involved in P53-mediated apoptosis.

== Structure ==
The BAX gene was the first identified pro-apoptotic member of the Bcl-2 protein family. Bcl-2 family members share one or more of the four characteristic domains of homology entitled the Bcl-2 homology (BH) domains (named BH1, BH2, BH3 and BH4), and can form hetero- or homodimers. These domains are composed of nine α-helices, with a hydrophobic α-helix core surrounded by amphipathic helices and a transmembrane C-terminal α-helix anchored to the mitochondrial outer membrane (MOM). A hydrophobic groove formed along the C-terminal of α2 to the N-terminal of α5, and some residues from α8, binds the BH3 domain of other BAX or BCL-2 proteins in its active form. In the protein's inactive form, the groove binds its transmembrane domain, transitioning it from a membrane-bound to a cytosolic protein. A smaller hydrophobic groove formed by the α1 and α6 helices is located on the opposite side of the protein from the major groove, and may serve as a BAX activation site.

Orthologs of the BAX gene have been identified in most mammals for which complete genome data are available.

== Function ==
In healthy mammalian cells, the majority of BAX is found in the cytosol, but upon initiation of apoptotic signaling, Bax undergoes a conformational shift. Upon induction of apoptosis, BAX becomes organelle membrane-associated, and in particular, mitochondrial membrane associated.

BAX is believed to interact with, and induce the opening of the mitochondrial voltage-dependent anion channel, VDAC. Alternatively, growing evidence also suggests that activated BAX and/or Bak form an oligomeric pore, MAC in the MOM (mitochondrial outer membrane). This results in the release of cytochrome c and other pro-apoptotic factors from the mitochondria, often referred to as mitochondrial outer membrane permeabilization, leading to activation of caspases. This defines a direct role for BAX in mitochondrial outer membrane permeabilization. BAX activation is stimulated by various abiotic factors, including heat, hydrogen peroxide, low or high pH, and mitochondrial membrane remodeling. In addition, it can become activated by binding BCL-2, as well as non-BCL-2 proteins such as p53 and Bif-1. Conversely, BAX can become inactivated by interacting with VDAC2, Pin1, and IBRDC2.

== Clinical significance ==
The expression of BAX is upregulated by the tumor suppressor protein p53, and BAX has been shown to be involved in p53-mediated apoptosis. The p53 protein is a transcription factor that, when activated as part of the cell's response to stress, regulates many downstream target genes, including BAX. Wild-type p53 has been demonstrated to upregulate the transcription of a chimeric reporter plasmid utilizing the consensus promoter sequence of BAX approximately 50-fold over mutant p53. Thus it is likely that p53 promotes BAX's apoptotic faculties in vivo as a primary transcription factor. However, p53 also has a transcription-independent role in apoptosis. In particular, p53 interacts with BAX, promoting its activation as well as its insertion into the mitochondrial membrane.

Drugs that activate BAX, such as ABT-737, a BH3 mimetic, hold promise as anticancer treatments by inducing apoptosis in cancer cells. For instance, binding of HA-BAD to BCL-xL and concomitant disruption of BAX:BCL-xL interaction was found to partly reverse paclitaxel resistance in human ovarian cancer cells. Meanwhile, excessive apoptosis in such conditions as ischemia reperfusion injury and amyotrophic lateral sclerosis may benefit from drug inhibitors of BAX.

== Interactions ==
Overview of signal transduction pathways involved with apoptosis.

Bcl-2-associated X protein has been shown to interact with:

- Bcl-2,
- BCL2L1,
- BCL2A1
- SH3GLB1,
- SLC25A4,
- VDAC1,
- TCTP,
- YWHAQ,
- Bid,
- Bim,
- Puma,
- Noxa,
- Mfn2,
- cholesterol, and
- cardiolipin.

== See also ==
- Apoptosis
- Apoptosome
- Bcl-2
- BH3 interacting domain death agonist (BID)
- Caspases
- Cytochrome c
- Noxa
- Mitochondrion
- p53 upregulated modulator of apoptosis (PUMA)
