= BCL2L14 =

Protein-coding gene in humans

Identifiers
- Aliases: BCL2L14, BCLG, BCL2 like 14
- External IDs: OMIM: 606126; MGI: 1914063; GeneCards: BCL2L14

Gene location (Human)
Chr.	Chromosome 12 (human)
Band	12p13.2	Start	12,049,844 bp
Band	12p13.2	End	12,211,084 bp

Gene location (Mouse)
Chr.	Chromosome 6 (mouse)
Band	6|6 G1	Start	134,373,281 bp
Band	6|6 G1	End	134,415,699 bp
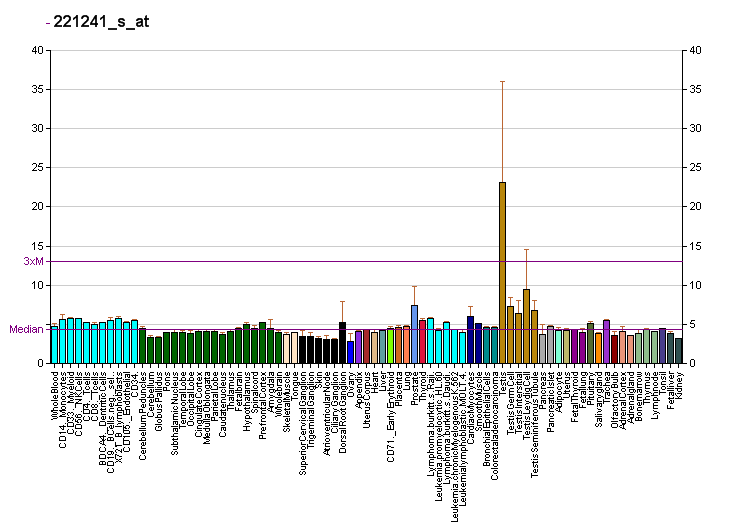
RNA expression pattern
Bgee	Human / Mouse (ortholog); Top expressed in: rectum; duodenum; left testis; right testis; mucosa of transverse colon; testicle; epithelium of colon; body of pancreas; gonad; appendix / Top expressed in: seminiferous tubule; spermatid; transitional epithelium of urinary bladder; submandibular gland; crypt of lieberkuhn of small intestine; duodenum; mucous cell of stomach; left colon; pyloric antrum; epithelium of stomach; More reference expression data
BioGPS	More reference expression data
Gene ontology
Molecular function	protein binding; protein kinase binding
Cellular component	intracellular organelle; membrane; endomembrane system; cytosol; cytoplasm
Biological process	positive regulation of extrinsic apoptotic signaling pathway; apoptotic process; regulation of apoptotic process
Sources:Amigo / QuickGO
Orthologs
Databases	NCBI: entry; OMA: entry
Species	Human	Mouse
Entrez	79370	66813
Ensembl	ENSG00000281449; ENSG00000121380	ENSMUSG00000030200
UniProt	Q9BZR8	Q9CPT0
RefSeq (mRNA)	NM_030766; NM_138722; NM_138723; NM_138724; NM_001370268 NM_001370269	NM_025778; NM_001355686
RefSeq (protein)	NP_110393; NP_620048; NP_620049; NP_001357197; NP_001357198	NP_080054; NP_001342615
Location (UCSC)	Chr 12: 12.05 – 12.21 Mb	Chr 6: 134.37 – 134.42 Mb
PubMed search
- Wikidata
View/Edit Human	View/Edit Mouse

Apoptosis facilitator Bcl-2-like protein 14 is a protein that in humans is encoded by the BCL2L14 gene.

The protein encoded by this gene belongs to the BCL2 protein family. BCL2 family members form hetero- or homodimers and act as anti- or pro-apoptotic regulators that are involved in a wide variety of cellular activities. Overexpression of this gene has been shown to induce apoptosis in cells. Four alternatively spliced transcript variants, which encode three distinct isoforms, have been reported for this gene.
