= 2'-phosphotransferase =

Class of enzymes

Identifiers
- EC no.: 2.7.1.160

Databases
- IntEnz: IntEnz view
- BRENDA: BRENDA entry
- ExPASy: NiceZyme view
- KEGG: KEGG entry
- MetaCyc: metabolic pathway
- PRIAM: profile
- PDB structures: RCSB PDB PDBe PDBsum
Search
- PMC: articles
- PubMed: articles
- NCBI: proteins

In enzymology, a 2'-phosphotransferase (EC 2.7.1.160) is an enzyme that catalyzes the chemical reaction

2'-phospho-[ligated tRNA] + NAD^{+} $\rightleftharpoons$ mature tRNA + ADP-ribose 1,2-phosphate + nicotinamide + H_{2}O

Thus, the two substrates of this enzyme are [[2'-phospho-[ligated tRNA]]] and NAD^{+}, whereas its 4 products are mature tRNA, ADP-ribose 1'',2''-phosphate, nicotinamide, and H_{2}O.

This enzyme belongs to the family of transferases, specifically those transferring phosphorus-containing groups (phosphotransferases) with an alcohol group as acceptor. The systematic name of this enzyme class is 2'-phospho-[ligated tRNA]:NAD+ phosphotransferase. Other names in common use include yeast 2'-phosphotransferase, Tpt1, Tpt1p, and 2'-phospho-tRNA:NAD+ phosphotransferase.
