= NOXA1 =

Protein-coding gene in the species Homo sapiens

Identifiers
- Aliases: NOXA1, NY-CO-31, SDCCAG31, p51NOX, NADPH oxidase activator 1
- External IDs: OMIM: 611255; MGI: 2449980; GeneCards: NOXA1

Gene location (Human)
Chr.	Chromosome 9 (human)
Band	9q34.3	Start	137,423,350 bp
Band	9q34.3	End	137,434,406 bp

Gene location (Mouse)
Chr.	Chromosome 2 (mouse)
Band	2|2 A3	Start	24,975,679 bp
Band	2|2 A3	End	24,985,161 bp
RNA expression pattern
Bgee	Human / Mouse (ortholog); Top expressed in: pancreatic ductal cell; mucosa of transverse colon; right uterine tube; right frontal lobe; anterior pituitary; Brodmann area 9; nucleus accumbens; body of pancreas; right hemisphere of cerebellum; cingulate gyrus / Top expressed in: ileum; colon; duodenum; jejunum; stomach; embryo; embryo; uterus; lung; liver; More reference expression data
BioGPS	n/a
Gene ontology
Molecular function	SH3 domain binding; enzyme binding; superoxide-generating NADPH oxidase activator activity; protein binding
Cellular component	cytoplasm; cytosol; plasma membrane; membrane; NADPH oxidase complex
Biological process	regulation of respiratory burst; superoxide metabolic process; regulation of hydrogen peroxide metabolic process; positive regulation of catalytic activity; superoxide anion generation
Sources:Amigo / QuickGO
Orthologs
Databases	NCBI: entry; OMA: entry
Species	Human	Mouse
Entrez	10811	241275
Ensembl	ENSG00000188747	ENSMUSG00000036805
UniProt	Q86UR1	Q8CJ00
RefSeq (mRNA)	NM_001256067; NM_001256068; NM_006647	NM_001163626; NM_172204
RefSeq (protein)	NP_001242996; NP_001242997; NP_006638	NP_001157098; NP_757341
Location (UCSC)	Chr 9: 137.42 – 137.43 Mb	Chr 2: 24.98 – 24.99 Mb
PubMed search
- Wikidata
View/Edit Human	View/Edit Mouse

NADPH oxidase activator 1 is an enzyme that in humans is encoded by the NOXA1 gene.
