= Translationally controlled tumor protein =

Protein-coding gene in humans

TPT1

Identifiers
- Aliases: TPT1, p02, p23, tumor protein, translationally-controlled 1, TCTP, HRF
- External IDs: MGI: 104890; GeneCards: TPT1
Available structures
PDB	Ortholog search: PDBe RCSB
PDB	List of PDB id codes 1YZ1, 3EBM, 4Z9V, 2HR9

Gene location (Human)
Chr.	Chromosome 13 (human)
Band	13q14.13	Start	45,333,471 bp
Band	13q14.13	End	45,341,284 bp

Gene location (Mouse)
Chr.	Chromosome 14 (mouse)
Band	14 D3|14 40.29 cM	Start	76,082,533 bp
Band	14 D3|14 40.29 cM	End	76,085,965 bp
RNA expression pattern
Bgee	Human / Mouse (ortholog); Top expressed in: mucosa of ileum; mucosa of urinary bladder; tibialis anterior muscle; body of tongue; urethra; skin of hip; vena cava; skin of thigh; human penis; caput epididymis / Top expressed in: ventricular zone; ganglionic eminence; epiblast; thymus; zone of skin; spleen; esophagus; lip; uterus; quadriceps femoris muscle; More reference expression data
BioGPS	n/a
Gene ontology
Molecular function	calcium ion binding; protein binding; microtubule binding; RNA binding
Cellular component	cytoplasm; multivesicular body; tubulin complex; extracellular exosome; nucleus; extracellular space; cytosol; spindle pole; cytoplasmic microtubule
Biological process	regulation of apoptotic process; response to virus; cellular calcium ion homeostasis; negative regulation of apoptotic process; negative regulation of intrinsic apoptotic signaling pathway in response to DNA damage; calcium ion transport; cell differentiation
Sources:Amigo / QuickGO
Orthologs
Databases	NCBI: entry; OMA: entry
Species	Human	Mouse
Entrez	7178	22070
Ensembl	ENSG00000133112	ENSMUSG00000060126
UniProt	P13693	P63028
RefSeq (mRNA)	NM_001286272; NM_001286273; NM_003295	NM_009429
RefSeq (protein)	NP_001273201; NP_001273202; NP_003286	NP_033455
Location (UCSC)	Chr 13: 45.33 – 45.34 Mb	Chr 14: 76.08 – 76.09 Mb
PubMed search
- Wikidata
View/Edit Human	View/Edit Mouse

Translationally controlled tumor protein (TCTP) is a protein that in humans is encoded by the TPT1 gene. TPT1 is mapped to 13q12-q14 on chromosome 13. The human gene contains five introns and six exons, TPT1 contains a promoter with a canonical TATA-box and several promoter elements, which are well-conserved in mammals. The assay with reporter gene exhibits a strong promoter activity comparable to viral promoters.

TCTP protein is also known as p23, Fortilin, and histamine-releasing factor.

TCTP is a multifunctional and highly conserved protein that existed ubiquitously in different eukaryote species and distributed widely in various tissues and cell types.

TCTP in the human is a growth-related, calcium-binding protein.

== History ==
Translationally controlled tumor protein was first discovered in 1989 as a cDNA sequence obtained from a human mammary carcinoma cDNA library with proves derived from the translationally controlled, growth-related mouse tumor protein TCTP. TCTP was originally described as a growth related protein of tumor cells. Its mRNA accumulates in translationally repressed postpolysomal mRNP-complexes.

Research in 1997 shown that TCTP is not a tumor- or tissue-specific protein, but is expressed ubiquitously from plants to mammals. Later studies show TCTP involvement in a protozoan Trypanosoma brucei.

== Characteristics ==
TCTP is a 20–25 kDa protein abundantly and ubiquitously expressed in the cell. The protein is transcribed in more than 500 different tissues and cell types; hTCTP gene is one of the top 10 most ubiquitously expressed genes in humans by examining 1753 libraries from kinds of tissues, but differed considerably in their quantity and ratio of expression. The expression is lower in kidney and renal cells. This indicates an extensive transcriptional control and involvement of tissue-specific factors.

The majority of publications established TCTP to be a cytoplasmic protein but nuclear localisation has also been reported, as well as extracellular activity; however, the process of secretion has not been found.

== Function ==
The abundance and ubiquity indicate that TCTP may have important primary functions. However, a large number of cellular and biochemical functions have been found since 1980s. Most of these functions can be classified into three groups.

=== Growth-related ===
TCTP has properties of a tubulin binding protein that associates with microtubules in a cell cycle-dependent manner.

The transient overexpression of TCTP in HeLa cells prevented them from undergoing etoposide-induced apoptosis. Expressing TCTP in U2OS (human bone osteosarcoma epithelial cells) protected them from cell death induced by etoposide over various concentrations and durations of exposure. TCTP overexpression inhibited caspase-3-like activity as assessed by the cleavage of fluorogenic substrate.

Expression levels of TCTP were down-regulated at the mRNA and protein levels during tumor suppression and by the activation of p53 and Siah-1 very well known anti-tumor genes. Down-regulation of TCTP can induce tumor reversion, and in combination with some drugs that decrease the level of TCTP and will lead to kill tumor cells. TCTP knockdown in primary mammary tumor cells, results in increased p53 expression and a decreased number of stem-like cancer cells.

Reducing TCTP (dTCTP) levels in Drosophila reduces cell size, cell number and organ size, which mimics Drosophila Rheb (dRheb) mutant phenotypes; human TCTP (hTCTP) shows similar biochemical properties compared to dTCTP.

=== Immunity-related ===
TCTP caused histamine release from the human basophils of a subpopulation of donors, and this release was dependent on IgE. The expression of TCTP is regulated at two distinct levels, depletion of the ER calcium causes an increase in TCTP mRNA abundance, increased cytosolic calcium concentrations regulate gene expression at the post-transcriptional level.

Downregulation of the protein levels by siRNA in HTR-8/SVneo (Homo sapiens placenta cells) was associated with a reduced cellular calcium-uptake activity and buffering capacity.

=== Cancer-related ===
Translationally controlled tumor protein has a role in tumor reversion and development.

TCTP is a regulator of the cancer stem cell compartment, the tumor reversion, tumor progression and certain forms of inflammatory diseases. Moreover, TCTP was described as a pro-survival protein antagonizing BAX function.

== Structure ==
Sequence alignment of TCTP sequences from more than 30 different species reveals a high degree of conservation over a long period of evolution.

The solution structure of TCTP from yeast, Schizosaccharomyces pombe has been determined by NMR spectroscopy which indicated that this protein is structurally similar to two small guanine nucleotide-free chaperones, namely Mss4 and Dss4. TCTP and Mss4/Dss4 are now therefore structurally grouped into one protein superfamily.

Translationally controlled tumor protein (TCTP) is involved in a wide range of molecular interactions with biological and nonbiological partners of various chemical compositions such as proteins, peptides, nucleic acids, carbohydrates, or small molecules. TCTP is therefore an important and versatile binding platform. Many of these protein–protein interactions have been validated, albeit only few received an in-depth structural characterization. In TCTP/tpt1 - Remodeling Signaling from Stem Cell to Disease, focus is on the structural analysis of TCTP and the review of the available literature regarding its interaction network from a structural perspective.

The structure of TCTP has a very complex topology composed of three alpha helices, and eleven beta strands arranged in two small beta-sheets, one larger than the other.

== Interactions ==
TCTP is reported to interact with dozens of other proteins, which relates to its functions in many cellular and biological mechanisms. TCTP has been shown for example to interact with:

- Apoptosis regulator BAX
- Mcl-1
- Bcl-xL
