= Bcl-2 family =

Apoptosis regulator proteins, Bcl-2 family
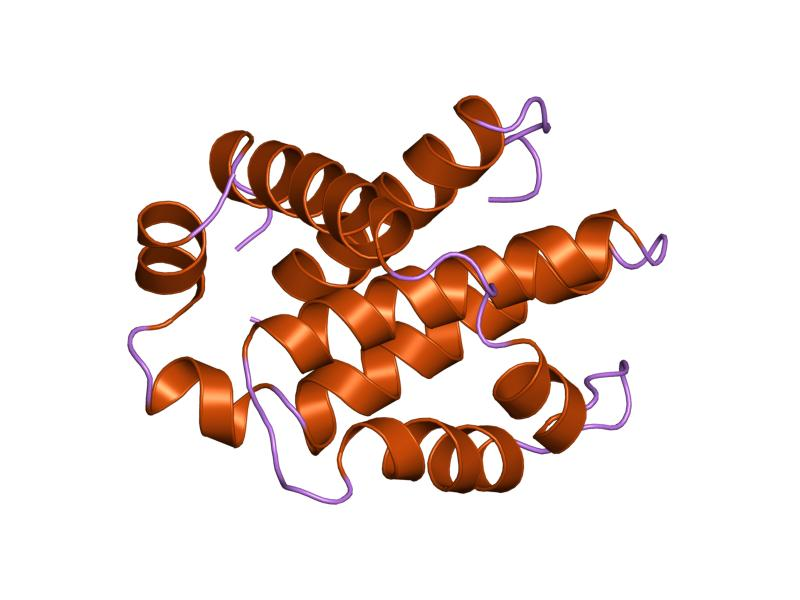
- Structure of human Bcl-xL, an inhibitor of programmed cell death.

Identifiers
- Symbol: Bcl-2
- Pfam: PF00452
- InterPro: IPR002475
- SMART: SM00337
- PROSITE: PDOC00829
- SCOP2: 1maz / SCOPe / SUPFAM
- OPM superfamily: 40
- OPM protein: 2l5b
- Membranome: 232
Available protein structures:
- PDB: IPR002475 PF00452 (ECOD; PDBsum)
- AlphaFold: IPR002475; PF00452

The Bcl-2 family (TC# 1.A.21) consists of a number of evolutionarily-conserved proteins that share Bcl-2 homology (BH) domains. The Bcl-2 family is most notable for their regulation of apoptosis, a form of programmed cell death, at the mitochondrion. The Bcl-2 family proteins consists of members that either promote or inhibit apoptosis, and control apoptosis by governing mitochondrial outer membrane permeabilization (MOMP), which is a key step in the intrinsic pathway of apoptosis. A total of 25 genes in the Bcl-2 family were identified by 2008.

Members of the BCL-2 family regulate apoptosis in mammals, reptiles, amphibs, fish, and other phyla of metazoan life, with exception of nematodes and insects. Their molecular structure and function, as well as their protein dynamics, are highly conserved over hundreds of millions of years in tissue forming life forms.

== Structure ==
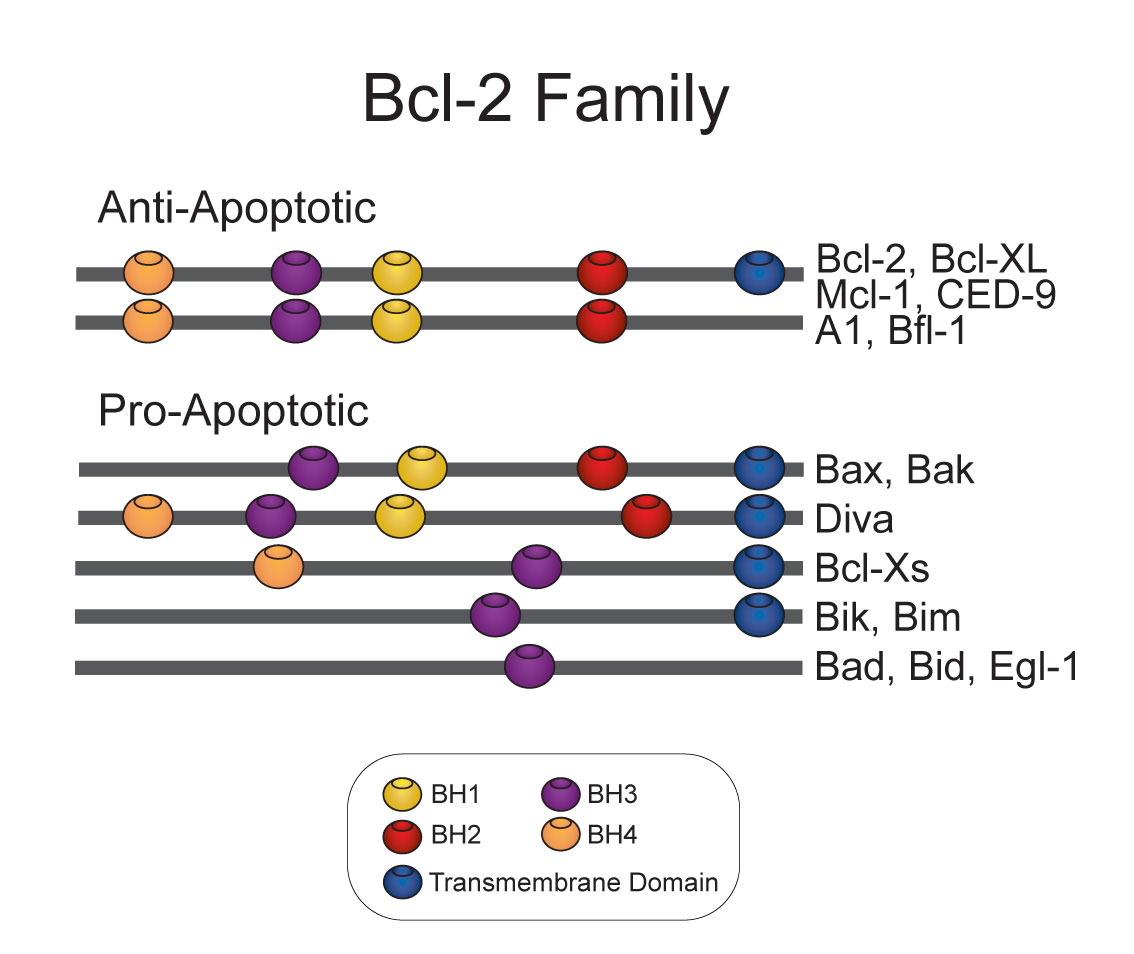
Domains of the Bcl-2 family

Bcl-2 family proteins have a general structure that consists of a hydrophobic α-helix surrounded by amphipathic α-helices. Some members of the family have transmembrane domains at their c-terminus which primarily function to localize them to the mitochondrion.

Bcl-x(L) is 233 amino acyl residues (aas) long and exhibits a single very hydrophobic putative transmembrane α-helical segment (residues 210-226) when in the membrane. Homologues of Bcl-x include the Bax (rat; 192 aas) and Bak (mouse; 208 aas) proteins, which also influence apoptosis. The high resolution structure of the monomeric soluble form of human Bcl-x(L) has been determined by both x-ray crystallography and NMR.

The structure consists of two central primarily hydrophobic α-helices surrounded by amphipathic helices. The arrangement of the α-helices in Bcl-X(L) resembles that for diphtheria toxin and the colicins. Diphtheria toxin forms a transmembrane pore and translocates the toxic catalytic domain into the animal cell cytoplasm. The colicins similarly form pores in lipid bilayers. Structural homology therefore suggests that Bcl-2 family members that contain the BH1 and BH2 domains (Bcl-X(L) Bcl-2 and Bax) function similarly.

=== Domains ===
The members of the Bcl-2 family share one or more of the four characteristic domains of homology entitled the Bcl-2 homology (BH) domains (named BH1, BH2, BH3 and BH4) (see figure). The BH domains are known to be crucial for function, as deletion of these domains via molecular cloning affects survival/apoptosis rates. The anti-apoptotic Bcl-2 proteins, such as Bcl-2 and Bcl-xL, conserve all four BH domains. The BH domains also serve to subdivide the pro-apoptotic Bcl-2 proteins into those with several BH domains (e.g. Bax and Bak) or those proteins that have only the BH3 domain (e.g. Bim Bid and BAD)

All proteins belonging to the Bcl-2 family contain either a BH1, BH2, BH3 or BH4 domain. All anti-apoptotic proteins contain BH1 and BH2 domains, some of them contain an additional N-terminal BH4 domain (Bcl-2, Bcl-x(L) and Bcl-w), which is also seen in some pro-apoptotic proteins like Bcl-x(S), Diva, Bok-L and Bok-S. On the other hand, all pro-apoptotic proteins contain a BH3 domain necessary for dimerization with other proteins of Bcl-2 family and crucial for their killing activity, some of them also contain BH1 and BH2 domains (Bax and Bak). The BH3 domain is also present in some anti-apoptotic protein, such as Bcl-2 or Bcl-x(L). The three functionally important Bcl-2 homology regions (BH1, BH2 and BH3) are in close spatial proximity. They form an elongated cleft that may provide the binding site for other Bcl-2 family members.

== Function ==
Overview of signal transduction pathways involved in apoptosis.

Regulated cell death (apoptosis) is induced by events such as growth factor withdrawal and toxins. It is controlled by regulators, which have either an inhibitory effect on programmed cell death (anti-apoptotic) or block the protective effect of inhibitors (pro-apoptotic). Many viruses have found a way of countering defensive apoptosis by encoding their own anti-apoptosis genes preventing their target-cells from dying too soon.

Bcl-x is a dominant regulator of programmed cell death in mammalian cells. The long form (Bcl-x(L), displays cell death repressor activity, but the short isoform (Bcl-x(S)) and the β-isoform (Bcl-xβ) promote cell death. Bcl-x(L), Bcl-x(S) and Bcl-xβ are three isoforms derived by alternative RNA splicing.

There are a number of theories concerning how the Bcl-2 gene family exert their pro- or anti-apoptotic effect. An important one states that this is achieved by activation or inactivation of an inner mitochondrial permeability transition pore, which is involved in the regulation of matrix Ca^{2+}, pH, and voltage. It is also thought that some Bcl-2 family proteins can induce (pro-apoptotic members) or inhibit (anti-apoptotic members) the release of cytochrome c into the cytosol which, once there, activates caspase-9 and caspase-3, leading to apoptosis. Although Zamzami et al. suggest that the release of cytochrome c is indirectly mediated by the PT pore on the inner mitochondrial membrane, strong evidence suggest an earlier implication of the MAC pore on the outer membrane.

Another theory suggests that Rho proteins play a role in Bcl-2, Mcl-1 and Bid activation. Rho inhibition reduces the expression of anti-apoptotic Bcl-2 and Mcl-1 proteins and increases protein levels of pro-apoptotic Bid but had no effect on Bax or FLIP levels. Rho inhibition induces caspase-9 and caspase-3-dependent apoptosis of cultured human endothelial cells.

=== Site of action ===
These proteins are localized to the outer mitochondrial membrane of the animal cell where they are thought to form a complex with the voltage-dependent anion channel porin (VDAC). Interaction of Bcl-2 with VDAC1 or with peptides derived from VDAC3 protects against cell death by inhibiting cytochrome c release. A direct interaction of Bcl-2 with bilayer-reconstituted purified VDAC was demonstrated, with Bcl-2 decreasing channel conductance.

Within the mitochondria are apoptogenic factors (cytochrome c, Smac/Diablo homolog, Omi) that if released activate the executioners of apoptosis, the caspases. Depending on their function, once activated, Bcl-2 proteins either promote the release of these factors, or keep them sequestered in the mitochondria. Whereas the activated pro-apoptotic Bak and/or Bax would form MAC and mediate the release of cytochrome c, the anti-apoptotic Bcl-2 would block it, possibly through inhibition of Bax and/or Bak.

Proteins of the Bcl-2 family are also present in the perinuclear envelope and are widely distributed in many body tissues. Their ability to form oligomeric pores in artificial lipid bilayers has been documented but the physiological significance of pore formation is not clear. Each of these proteins has distinctive properties, including some degree of ion selectivity.

=== Transport reaction ===
The generalized transport reaction proposed for membrane-embedded, oligomeric Bcl-2 family members is:

cytochrome c (mitochondrial intermembrane space) ⇌ cytochrome c (cytoplasm)

== BH3-only family ==
The BH3-only subset of the Bcl-2 family of proteins contain only a single BH3-domain. The BH3-only members play a key role in promoting apoptosis. The BH3-only family members are Bim, Bid, BAD and others. Various apoptotic stimuli induce expression and/or activation of specific BH3-only family members, which translocate to the mitochondria and initiate Bax/Bak-dependent apoptosis.

== Examples ==
Proteins that are known to contain these domains include vertebrate Bcl-2 (alpha and beta isoforms) and Bcl-x (isoforms Bcl-x(L).

- BCL2L1, BCL2L2, BCL2L10, BCL2L13, BCL2L14
- BOK
- MCL1

== See also ==
- Bcl-2 inhibitor, anti-cancer drugs targeted at this family of proteins
- B-cell CLL/lymphoma, a wider group
