= Bcl-2 homologous antagonist killer =

Protein-coding gene in the species Homo sapiens

BAK1
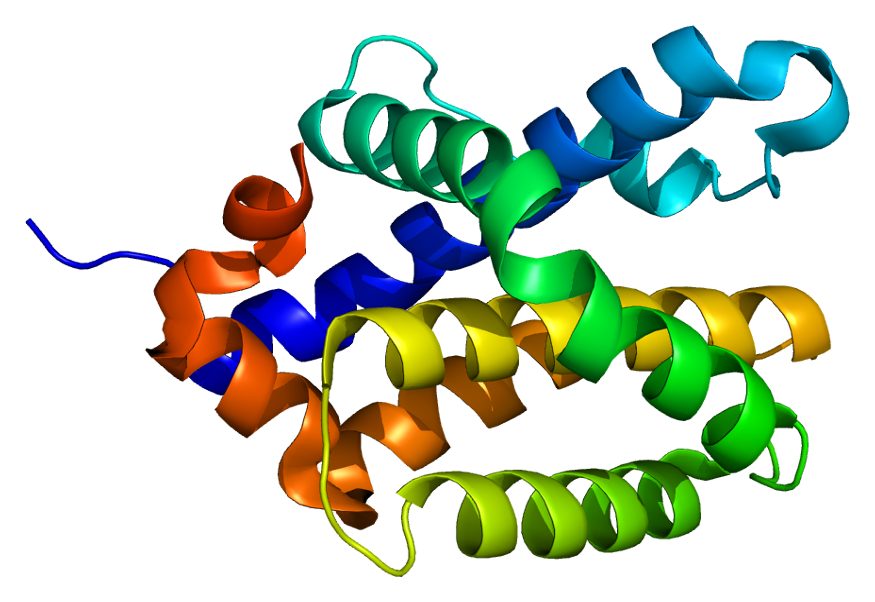

Identifiers
- Aliases: BAK1, BAK, BAK-LIKE, BCL2L7, CDN1, BCL2 antagonist/killer 1
- External IDs: OMIM: 600516; MGI: 1097161; GeneCards: BAK1
Available structures
PDB	Ortholog search: PDBe RCSB
PDB	List of PDB id codes 5AJK, 1BXL, 2IMS, 2IMT, 2JBY, 2JCN, 2LP8, 2M5B, 2XPX, 3I1H, 3QBR, 4D2L, 4U2U, 4U2V, 4UF1, 5FMK, 5FMI

Gene location (Human)
Chr.	Chromosome 6 (human)
Band	6p21.31	Start	33,572,547 bp
Band	6p21.31	End	33,580,293 bp
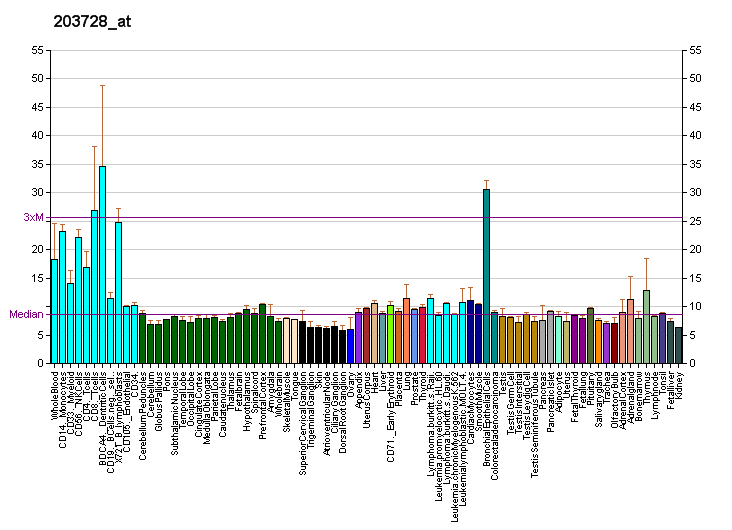
RNA expression pattern
Bgee	Human / Mouse (ortholog); Top expressed in: mucosa of transverse colon; granulocyte; left adrenal gland; left adrenal cortex; right adrenal gland; monocyte; apex of heart; duodenum; right adrenal cortex; rectum / n/a; More reference expression data
BioGPS	More reference expression data
Gene ontology
Molecular function	transmembrane transporter binding; metal ion binding; protein binding; identical protein binding; protein homodimerization activity; molecular function; heat shock protein binding; protein heterodimerization activity; chaperone binding; BH domain binding
Cellular component	integral component of membrane; cytosol; membrane; mitochondrial membranes; integral component of mitochondrial outer membrane; intracellular anatomical structure; endoplasmic reticulum; mitochondrion; pore complex; mitochondrial outer membrane; BAK complex
Biological process	mitochondrial fusion; leukocyte homeostasis; regulation of apoptotic process; positive regulation of endoplasmic reticulum unfolded protein response; establishment or maintenance of transmembrane electrochemical gradient; limb morphogenesis; positive regulation of calcium ion transport into cytosol; response to organic cyclic compound; B cell apoptotic process; regulation of protein heterodimerization activity; positive regulation of mitochondrial outer membrane permeabilization involved in apoptotic signaling pathway; vagina development; homeostasis of number of cells; cellular response to UV; myeloid cell homeostasis; ageing; post-embryonic camera-type eye morphogenesis; B cell homeostasis; thymocyte apoptotic process; endoplasmic reticulum calcium ion homeostasis; negative regulation of gene expression; regulation of cell cycle; regulation of mitochondrial membrane potential; positive regulation of IRE1-mediated unfolded protein response; blood vessel remodeling; intrinsic apoptotic signaling pathway in response to endoplasmic reticulum stress; brain development; response to fungus; regulation of mitochondrial membrane permeability; cellular response to mechanical stimulus; fibroblast apoptotic process; activation of cysteine-type endopeptidase activity; apoptotic process involved in blood vessel morphogenesis; activation of cysteine-type endopeptidase activity involved in apoptotic process by cytochrome c; animal organ regeneration; negative regulation of peptidyl-serine phosphorylation; positive regulation of proteolysis; positive regulation of release of cytochrome c from mitochondria; apoptotic signaling pathway; negative regulation of endoplasmic reticulum calcium ion concentration; cell population proliferation; response to ethanol; activation of cysteine-type endopeptidase activity involved in apoptotic process; response to gamma radiation; regulation of protein homodimerization activity; response to UV-C; response to hydrogen peroxide; endocrine pancreas development; release of cytochrome c from mitochondria; B cell negative selection; negative regulation of cell population proliferation; response to mycotoxin; positive regulation of apoptotic process; intrinsic apoptotic signaling pathway in response to DNA damage; extrinsic apoptotic signaling pathway in absence of ligand; apoptotic process; Unfolded protein response
Sources:Amigo / QuickGO
Orthologs
Databases	NCBI: entry; OMA: entry
Species	Human	Mouse
Entrez	578	12018
Ensembl	ENSG00000030110	ENSMUSG00000057789
UniProt	Q16611	O08734
RefSeq (mRNA)	NM_001188	NM_007523
RefSeq (protein)	NP_001179	NP_031549
Location (UCSC)	Chr 6: 33.57 – 33.58 Mb	n/a
PubMed search
- Wikidata
View/Edit Human	View/Edit Mouse

Bcl-2 homologous antagonist/killer is a protein which in humans is encoded by the BAK1 gene on chromosome 6. It belongs to the BCL2 protein family. BCL2 family members form oligomers or heterodimers and act as anti- or pro-apoptotic regulators that are involved in a wide variety of cellular activities. This protein localizes to mitochondria, and functions to induce apoptosis. It interacts with and accelerates the opening of the mitochondrial voltage-dependent anion channel, which leads to a loss in membrane potential and the release of cytochrome c. This protein also interacts with the tumor suppressor P53 after exposure to cell stress.

== Structure ==
BAK1 is a pro-apoptotic Bcl-2 protein containing four Bcl-2 homology (BH) domains: BH1, BH2, BH3, and BH4. These domains are composed of nine α-helices, with a hydrophobic α-helix core surrounded by amphipathic helices and a transmembrane C-terminal α-helix anchored to the mitochondrial outer membrane (MOM). A hydrophobic groove formed along the C-terminal of α2 to the N-terminal of α5, and some residues from α8, binds the BH3 domain of other BCL-2 proteins in its active form.

== Function ==
As a member of the BCL2 protein family, BAK1 functions as a pro-apoptotic regulator involved in a wide variety of cellular activities. In healthy mammalian cells, BAK1 localizes primarily to the MOM, but remains in an inactive form until stimulated by apoptotic signaling. The inactive form of BAK1 is maintained by the protein's interactions with VDAC2, Mtx2, and other anti-apoptotic members of the BCL2 protein family. Nonetheless, VDAC2 functions to recruit newly synthesized BAK1 to the mitochondria to carry out apoptosis. Moreover, BAK1 is believed to induce the opening of the mitochondrial voltage-dependent anion channel, leading to release of cytochrome c from the mitochondria. Alternatively, BAK1 itself forms an oligomeric pore, MAC, in the MOM, through which pro-apoptotic factors leak in a process called MOM permeabilization.

== Clinical significance ==
Generally, the pro-apoptotic function of BAK1 contributes to neurodegenerative and autoimmune diseases when overexpressed and cancers when inhibited. For instance, dysregulation of the BAK gene has been implicated in human gastrointestinal cancers, indicating that the gene plays a part in the pathogenesis of some cancers.

BAK1 is also involved in the HIV replication pathway, as the virus induces apoptosis in T cells via Casp8p41, which activates BAK to carry out membrane permeabilization, leading to cell death. Consequently, drugs that regulate BAK1 activity present promising treatments for these diseases.

Recently, one study of the role of genetics in abdominal aortic aneurysm (AAA) showed that different BAK1 variants can exist in both diseased and non-diseased AA tissues compared to matching blood samples. Given the current paradigm that all cells have the same genomic DNA, BAK1 gene variants in different tissues may be easily explained by the expression of BAK1 gene on chromosome 6 and one its edited copies on chromosome 20.

== Interactions ==
BAK1 has been shown to interact with:

- BCL2-like 1,
- Bcl-2,
- MCL1,
- P53,
- Casp8p41,
- VDAC2,
- Mtx2,
- Mcl-1,
- Bid,
- Bim, and
- Puma.
