= ABT-737 =

Chemical compound

Names
- Preferred IUPAC name 4-{4-[(4′-Chloro[1,1′-biphenyl]-2-yl)methyl]piperazin-1-yl}-N-(4-{[(2R)-4-(dimethylamino)-1-(phenylsulfanyl)butan-2-yl]amino}-3-nitrobenzene-1-sulfonyl)benzamide

Identifiers
CAS Number	852808-04-9
3D model (JSmol)	Interactive image
ChEBI	CHEBI:47575
ChemSpider	9403232
PubChem CID	11228183
UNII	Z5NFR173NV
CompTox Dashboard (EPA)	DTXSID7042641
- InChI: InChI=1S/C42H45ClN6O5S2/c1-46(2)23-22-35(30-55-37-9-4-3-5-10-37)44-40-21-20-38(28-41(40)49(51)52)56(53,54)45-42(50)32-14-18-36(19-15-32)48-26-24-47(25-27-48)29-33-8-6-7-11-39(33)31-12-16-34(43)17-13-31/h3-21,28,35,44H,22-27,29-30H2,1-2H3,(H,45,50)/t35-/m1/s1 Key: HPLNQCPCUACXLM-PGUFJCEWSA-N; InChI=1/C42H45ClN6O5S2/c1-46(2)23-22-35(30-55-37-9-4-3-5-10-37)44-40-21-20-38(28-41(40)49(51)52)56(53,54)45-42(50)32-14-18-36(19-15-32)48-26-24-47(25-27-48)29-33-8-6-7-11-39(33)31-12-16-34(43)17-13-31/h3-21,28,35,44H,22-27,29-30H2,1-2H3,(H,45,50)/t35-/m1/s1 Key: HPLNQCPCUACXLM-PGUFJCEWBK
- SMILES: CN(C)CC[C@H](CSc1ccccc1)Nc2ccc(cc2[N+](=O)[O-])S(=O)(=O)NC(=O)c3ccc(cc3)N4CCN(CC4)Cc5ccccc5c6ccc(cc6)Cl

Properties
Chemical formula	C_{42}H_{45}ClN_{6}O_{5}S_{2}
Molar mass	813.43 g·mol^{−1}
- Except where otherwise noted, data are given for materials in their standard state (at 25 °C [77 °F], 100 kPa). Infobox references

ABT-737 is a small molecule drug that inhibits Bcl-2 and Bcl-xL, two members of the Bcl-2 family of evolutionarily-conserved proteins that share Bcl-2 Homology (BH) domains. First developed as a potential cancer chemotherapy, it was subsequently identified as a senolytic (a drug that selectively induces cell death in senescent cells).

The Bcl-2 family is most notable for their regulation of apoptosis, a form of programmed cell death, at the mitochondrion; Bcl-2 and Bcl-xL are anti-apoptotic proteins. Because many cancers have mutations in these genes that allow them to survive, scientists began working to develop drugs that would inhibit this pathway in the 1990s. ABT-737 was one of the earliest of a series of drugs developed by Abbott Laboratories (now Abbvie) to target this pathway, based on their resolution of the 3D structure of Bcl-xL and studies using high-field solution nuclear magnetic resonance (NMR) that revealed how the BH domains of these proteins interacted with their targets.

ABT-737 was superior to previous BCL-2 inhibitors given its higher affinity for Bcl-2, Bcl-xL and Bcl-w. In vitro studies showed that primary cells from patients with B-cell malignancies are sensitive to ABT-737. In animal models, it improved survival, caused tumor regression, and cured a high percentage of mice. In preclinical studies utilizing patient xenografts, ABT-737 showed efficacy for treating lymphoma and other blood cancers.

Unfortunately, ABT-737 is not bioavailable after oral administration, leading to the development of navitoclax (ABT-263) as an orally-available derivative with similar activity on small cell lung cancer (SCLC) cell lines. Navitoclax entered clinical trials, and showed promise in haematologic cancers, but was stalled when it was found to cause thrombocytopenia (severe loss of platelets), which was discovered to be caused by the platelets' requirement for Bcl-xL for survival.

Subsequently, it was reported that ABT-737 specifically induces apoptosis in senescent cells in vitro and in mouse models.
