= Laura Niedernhofer =

American academic

- Born: Laura J. Niedernhofer; October 6, 1964 (age 62)

Laura J. Niedernhofer (born October 6, 1964) is an American professor of biochemistry, molecular biology, and biophysics, with expertise in the fields of DNA damage, repair, progeroid syndromes and cellular senescence

== Education and career ==
Niedernhofer studied from 1981 to 1985 at Duke University graduating with a B.S. chemistry, from 1989 to 1990 at Georgetown University School of Medicine graduating with an M.S. in physiology, and from 1990 to 1992 at the University of Alabama at Birmingham with training in medicine. At Nashville's Vanderbilt University School of Medicine she studied from 1992 to 1996 graduating with a Ph.D. in biochemistry and from 1996 to 1998 graduating with an M.D. As a postdoc from 1999 to 2003, she studied mouse genetics under the supervision of Jan Hoeijmakers at Rotterdam's Erasmus University Medical Center. Niederhofer was an associate professor of microbiology and molecular genetics at the University of Pittsburgh (2003 to 2012) and an associate professor of molecular medicine at the Florida campus of Scripps Research (2012 to 2018). At the University of Minnesota (2018 to present), she is a professor of biochemistry, molecular biology, and biophysics and director of the Institute of the Biology of Aging and Metabolism, as well head of the Niedernhofer Lab.

In 2017 Niedernhofer was one of fifteen recipients of the Glenn Award for Research in Biological Mechanisms of Aging. In 2018 she received the Vincent Cristofalo Rising Star Award in Aging Research from the American Federation for Aging Research.

== Research ==
The Institute on the Biology of Aging and Metabolism focuses on understanding the genetic, molecular and cellular mechanisms that make aging a driver of common chronic conditions and disease of older people. With colleague Paul Robbins, Niedernhofer discovered a class of drugs called senotherapeutics; drugs with clear aging cells from the body. Senescent cells cause inflammation and are cleared more slowly from an aging organism.

== Selected publications ==
- Niedernhofer, Laura J.; Daniels, J.Scott; Rouzer, Carol A.; Greene, Rachel E.; Marnett, Lawrence J. (2003). "Malondialdehyde, a Product of Lipid Peroxidation, is Mutagenic in Human Cells". Journal of Biological Chemistry. 278 (33): 31426–31433. doi:10.1074/jbc.M212549200. PMID 12775726.
- Zhu, Xu-Dong; Niedernhofer, Laura; Kuster, Bernhard; Mann, Matthias; Hoeijmakers, Jan H.J; De Lange, Titia (2003). "ERCC1/XPF Removes the 3′ Overhang from Uncapped Telomeres and Represses Formation of Telomeric DNA-Containing Double Minute Chromosomes". Molecular Cell. 12 (6): 1489–1498. doi:10.1016/S1097-2765(03)00478-7. PMID 14690602.
- Niedernhofer, Laura J.; Odijk, Hanny; Budzowska, Magda; Van Drunen, Ellen; Maas, Alex; Theil, Arjan F.; De Wit, Jan; Jaspers, N. G. J.; Beverloo, H. Berna; Hoeijmakers, Jan H. J.; Kanaar, Roland (2004). "The Structure-Specific Endonuclease Ercc1-XPF is Required to Resolve DNA Interstrand Cross-Link-Induced Double-Strand Breaks". Molecular and Cellular Biology. 24 (13): 5776–5787. Bibcode:2004MolCB..24.5776N. doi:10.1128/MCB.24.13.5776-5787.2004. PMC 480908. PMID 15199134.
- Niedernhofer, Laura J.; Lalai, Astrid S.; Hoeijmakers, Jan H.J. (2005). "Fanconi Anemia (Cross)linked to DNA Repair". Cell. 123 (7): 1191–1198. Bibcode:2005Cell..123.1191N. doi:10.1016/j.cell.2005.12.009. PMID 16377561. S2CID 15594679.
- Niedernhofer, Laura J.; Garinis, George A.; Raams, Anja; Lalai, Astrid S.; Robinson, Andria Rasile; Appeldoorn, Esther; Odijk, Hanny; Oostendorp, Roos; Ahmad, Anwaar; Van Leeuwen, Wibeke; Theil, Arjan F.; Vermeulen, Wim; Van Der Horst, Gijsbertus T. J.; Meinecke, Peter; Kleijer, Wim J.; Vijg, Jan; Jaspers, Nicolaas G. J.; Hoeijmakers, Jan H. J. (2006). "A new progeroid syndrome reveals that genotoxic stress suppresses the somatotroph axis". Nature. 444 (7122): 1038–1043. Bibcode:2006Natur.444.1038N. doi:10.1038/nature05456. PMID 17183314. S2CID 4358515.
- Van Der Pluijm, Ingrid; Garinis, George A.; Brandt, Renata M. C.; Gorgels, Theo G. M. F.; Wijnhoven, Susan W.; Diderich, Karin E. M.; De Wit, Jan; Mitchell, James R.; Van Oostrom, Conny; Beems, Rudolf; Niedernhofer, Laura J.; Velasco, Susana; Friedberg, Errol C.; Tanaka, Kiyoji; Van Steeg, Harry; Hoeijmakers, Jan H. J.; Van Der Horst, Gijsbertus T. J. (2006). "Impaired Genome Maintenance Suppresses the Growth Hormone–Insulin-Like Growth Factor 1 Axis in Mice with Cockayne Syndrome". PLOS Biology. 5 (1) e2. doi:10.1371/journal.pbio.0050002. PMC 1698505. PMID 17326724.
- Jaspers, Nicolaas G.J.; Raams, Anja; Silengo, Margherita Cirillo; Wijgers, Nils; Niedernhofer, Laura J.; Robinson, Andria Rasile; Giglia-Mari, Giuseppina; Hoogstraten, Deborah; Kleijer, Wim J.; Hoeijmakers, Jan H.J.; Vermeulen, Wim (2007). "First Reported Patient with Human ERCC1 Deficiency Has Cerebro-Oculo-Facio-Skeletal Syndrome with a Mild Defect in Nucleotide Excision Repair and Severe Developmental Failure". The American Journal of Human Genetics. 80 (3): 457–466. doi:10.1086/512486. PMC 1821117. PMID 17273966.
- Ahmad, Anwaar; Robinson, Andria Rasile; Duensing, Anette; Van Drunen, Ellen; Beverloo, H. Berna; Weisberg, David B.; Hasty, Paul; Hoeijmakers, Jan H. J.; Niedernhofer, Laura J. (2008). "ERCC1-XPF Endonuclease Facilitates DNA Double-Strand Break Repair". Molecular and Cellular Biology. 28 (16): 5082–5092. doi:10.1128/MCB.00293-08. PMC 2519706. PMID 18541667.
- Schumacher, Björn; Van Der Pluijm, Ingrid; Moorhouse, Michael J.; Kosteas, Theodore; Robinson, Andria Rasile; Suh, Yousin; Breit, Timo M.; Van Steeg, Harry; Niedernhofer, Laura J.; Van Ijcken, Wilfred; Bartke, Andrzej; Spindler, Stephen R.; Hoeijmakers, Jan H. J.; Van Der Horst, Gijsbertus T. J.; Garinis, George A. (2008). "Delayed and Accelerated Aging Share Common Longevity Assurance Mechanisms". PLOS Genetics. 4 (8) e1000161. doi:10.1371/journal.pgen.1000161. PMC 2493043. PMID 18704162.
- Tilstra, J. S.; Clauson, C. L.; Niedernhofer, L. J.; Robbins, P. D. (2011). "NF-κB in Aging and Disease". Aging and Disease. 2 (6): 449–465. PMC 3295063. PMID 22396894.
- Tilstra, Jeremy S.; Robinson, Andria R.; Wang, Jin; Gregg, Siobhán Q.; Clauson, Cheryl L.; Reay, Daniel P.; Nasto, Luigi A.; St Croix, Claudette M.; Usas, Arvydas; Vo, Nam; Huard, Johnny; Clemens, Paula R.; Stolz, Donna B.; Guttridge, Denis C.; Watkins, Simon C.; Garinis, George A.; Wang, Yinsheng; Niedernhofer, Laura J.; Robbins, Paul D. (2012). "NF-κB inhibition delays DNA damage–induced senescence and aging in mice". Journal of Clinical Investigation. 122 (7): 2601–2612. doi:10.1172/JCI45785. PMC 3386805. PMID 22706308.
- Clauson, C.; Scharer, O. D.; Niedernhofer, L. (2013). "Advances in Understanding the Complex Mechanisms of DNA Interstrand Cross-Link Repair". Cold Spring Harbor Perspectives in Biology. 5 (10) a012732. doi:10.1101/cshperspect.a012732. PMC 4123742. PMID 24086043.
- Fu, Lijuan; Guerrero, Candace R.; Zhong, Na; Amato, Nicholas J.; Liu, Yunhua; Liu, Shuo; Cai, Qian; Ji, Debin; Jin, Seung-Gi; Niedernhofer, Laura J.; Pfeifer, Gerd P.; Xu, Guo-Liang; Wang, Yinsheng (2014). "Tet-Mediated Formation of 5-Hydroxymethylcytosine in RNA". Journal of the American Chemical Society. 136 (33): 11582–11585. Bibcode:2014JAChS.13611582F. doi:10.1021/ja505305z. PMC 4140497. PMID 25073028.
- Zhu, Yi; et al. (2015). "The Achilles' heel of senescent cells: From transcriptome to senolytic drugs". Aging Cell. 14 (4): 644–658. doi:10.1111/acel.12344. PMC 4531078. PMID 25754370.
- Zhu, Yi; Tchkonia, Tamara; Fuhrmann-Stroissnigg, Heike; Dai, Haiming M.; Ling, Yuanyuan Y.; Stout, Michael B.; Pirtskhalava, Tamar; Giorgadze, Nino; Johnson, Kurt O.; Giles, Cory B.; Wren, Jonathan D.; Niedernhofer, Laura J.; Robbins, Paul D.; Kirkland, James L. (2016). "Identification of a novel senolytic agent, navitoclax, targeting the BCL-2 family of anti-apoptotic factors". Aging Cell. 15 (3): 428–435. doi:10.1111/acel.12445. PMC 4854923. PMID 26711051.
- Fuhrmann-Stroissnigg, Heike; Ling, Yuan Yuan; Zhao, Jing; McGowan, Sara J.; Zhu, Yi; Brooks, Robert W.; Grassi, Diego; Gregg, Siobhan Q.; Stripay, Jennifer L.; Dorronsoro, Akaitz; Corbo, Lana; Tang, Priscilla; Bukata, Christina; Ring, Nadja; Giacca, Mauro; Li, Xuesen; Tchkonia, Tamara; Kirkland, James L.; Niedernhofer, Laura J.; Robbins, Paul D. (2017). "Identification of HSP90 inhibitors as a novel class of senolytics". Nature Communications. 8 (1): 422. Bibcode:2017NatCo...8..422F. doi:10.1038/s41467-017-00314-z. PMC 5583353. PMID 28871086. S2CID 499103.
- Kirkland, James L.; Tchkonia, Tamara; Zhu, Yi; Niedernhofer, Laura J.; Robbins, Paul D. (2017). "The Clinical Potential of Senolytic Drugs". Journal of the American Geriatrics Society. 65 (10): 2297–2301. doi:10.1111/jgs.14969. PMC 5641223. PMID 28869295.
- Zhu, Y.; Doornebal, E. J.; Pirtskhalava, T.; Giorgadze, N.; Wentworth, M.; Fuhrmann-Stroissnigg, H.; Niedernhofer, L. J.; Robbins, P. D.; Tchkonia, T.; Kirkland, J. L. (2017). "New agents that target senescent cells: The flavone, fisetin, and the BCL-X_{L} inhibitors, A1331852 and A1155463". Aging. 9 (3): 955–963. doi:10.18632/aging.101202. PMC 5391241. PMID 28273655.
- Xu, Ming; et al. (2018). "Senolytics improve physical function and increase lifespan in old age". Nature Medicine. 24 (8): 1246–1256. Bibcode:2018NatMe..24.1246X. doi:10.1038/s41591-018-0092-9. PMC 6082705. PMID 29988130.
- Yousefzadeh, Matthew J.; Zhu, Yi; McGowan, Sara J.; Angelini, Luise; Fuhrmann-Stroissnigg, Heike; Xu, Ming; Ling, Yuan Yuan; Melos, Kendra I.; Pirtskhalava, Tamar; Inman, Christina L.; McGuckian, Collin; Wade, Erin A.; Kato, Jonathon I.; Grassi, Diego; Wentworth, Mark; Burd, Christin E.; Arriaga, Edgar A.; Ladiges, Warren L.; Tchkonia, Tamara; Kirkland, James L.; Robbins, Paul D.; Niedernhofer, Laura J. (2018). "Fisetin is a senotherapeutic that extends health and lifespan". eBioMedicine. 36: 18–28. doi:10.1016/j.ebiom.2018.09.015. PMC 6197652. PMID 30279143.
- Gorgoulis, Vassilis; Adams, Peter D.; Alimonti, Andrea; Bennett, Dorothy C.; Bischof, Oliver; Bishop, Cleo; Campisi, Judith; Collado, Manuel; Evangelou, Konstantinos; Ferbeyre, Gerardo; Gil, Jesús; Hara, Eiji; Krizhanovsky, Valery; Jurk, Diana; Maier, Andrea B.; Narita, Masashi; Niedernhofer, Laura; Passos, João F.; Robbins, Paul D.; Schmitt, Clemens A.; Sedivy, John; Vougas, Konstantinos; von Zglinicki, Thomas; Zhou, Daohong; Serrano, Manuel; Demaria, Marco (2019). "Cellular Senescence: Defining a Path Forward". Cell. 179 (4): 813–827. Bibcode:2019Cell..179..813G. doi:10.1016/j.cell.2019.10.005. hdl:10044/1/74383. PMID 31675495. S2CID 204971698.
- Robbins, Paul D.; Jurk, Diana; Khosla, Sundeep; Kirkland, James L.; Lebrasseur, Nathan K.; Miller, Jordan D.; Passos, João F.; Pignolo, Robert J.; Tchkonia, Tamar; Niedernhofer, Laura J. (2021). "Senolytic Drugs: Reducing Senescent Cell Viability to Extend Health Span". Annual Review of Pharmacology and Toxicology. 61: 779–803. doi:10.1146/annurev-pharmtox-050120-105018. PMC 7790861. PMID 32997601.
