= Foselutoclax =

Clinical data
- Other names: UBX1325

Identifiers
- IUPAC name: 5-(4-chlorophenyl)-2-methyl-4-[3-[4-[4-[[4-[[(2R)-1-phenylsulfanyl-4-(4-phosphonooxypiperidin-1-yl)butan-2-yl]amino]-3-(trifluoromethylsulfonyl)phenyl]sulfonylamino]phenyl]piperazin-1-yl]phenyl]-1-propan-2-ylpyrrole-3-carboxylic acid
- CAS Number: 2271269-01-1
- PubChem CID: 147562879
- IUPHAR/BPS: 13366
- ChemSpider: 115277082
- UNII: VT53CL5GES

Chemical and physical data
- Formula: C_{53}H_{59}ClF_{3}N_{6}O_{10}PS_{3}
- Molar mass: 1159.69 g·mol^{−1}
- 3D model (JSmol): Interactive image
- SMILES: CC1=C(C(=C(N1C(C)C)C2=CC=C(C=C2)Cl)C3=CC(=CC=C3)N4CCN(CC4)C5=CC=C(C=C5)NS(=O)(=O)C6=CC(=C(C=C6)N[C@H](CCN7CCC(CC7)OP(=O)(O)O)CSC8=CC=CC=C8)S(=O)(=O)C(F)(F)F)C(=O)O
- InChI: InChI=InChI=1S/C53H59ClF3N6O10PS3/c1-35(2)63-36(3)49(52(64)65)50(51(63)37-12-14-39(54)15-13-37)38-8-7-9-43(32-38)62-30-28-61(29-31-62)42-18-16-40(17-19-42)59-77(71,72)46-20-21-47(48(33-46)76(69,70)53(55,56)57)58-41(34-75-45-10-5-4-6-11-45)22-25-60-26-23-44(24-27-60)73-74(66,67)68/h4-21,32-33,35,41,44,58-59H,22-31,34H2,1-3H3,(H,64,65)(H2,66,67,68)/t41-/m1/s1; Key:FSZILRQCEAUYPL-VQJSHJPSSA-N

Foselutoclax is an investigational new drug that is being evaluated for the treatment of age-related eye diseases, particularly diabetic macular edema (DME) and wet age-related macular degeneration (AMD). Developed by Unity Biotechnology, this senolytic compound acts as a potent inhibitor of Bcl-xL, a protein that senescent cells rely on for survival. Foselutoclax is designed to selectively eliminate senescent cells in the retina, potentially addressing the underlying causes of vision loss in these conditions.
