= Geroprotector =

Medical therapy against aging

A geroprotector aims to affect the root cause of aging and age-related diseases, and thus prolong the life span of animals. Some possible geroprotectors include melatonin, carnosine, metformin, rapamycin, nicotinamide mononucleotide (NMN), delta sleep-inducing peptide,glycine, and psilocin.

Geroprotectors could belong to multiple classes, depending on which of the hallmarks of aging they influence.

The distinction between geroprotectors and senotherapeutics is an evolving area of aging research. Geroprotectors broadly aim to target multiple mechanisms of aging, prolonging lifespan and healthspan by addressing the fundamental causes of aging. Senotherapeutics, on the other hand, are a subset of therapies that specifically target senescent cells, which are dysfunctional cells that accumulate with age and contribute to inflammation and age-related diseases.

== Research ==
In geroscience, drugs proposed to slow ageing are often called gerotherapeutics. These compounds act on the hallmarks of aging as well as on a specific disease, aiming to benefit several age-related conditions at once. As of 2022, the only accepted means of targeting ageing in people were diet and exercise. At that time, drug regulators did not recognise outcomes based on targeting ageing as a route to approval. These regulators included the US Food and Drug Administration and the European Medicines Agency.

=== mTOR inhibitors ===
Several research groups have tested the mTORC1 inhibitor rapamycin for its effect on lifespan in mice. The first was a 2009 study by the National Institute on Aging's Interventions Testing Program. It found that rapamycin lengthened the lives of genetically diverse mice. Unlike caloric restriction, rapamycin remained effective when started at 20 months of age, roughly equivalent to a 60-year-old person. Rapamycin has side effects, including immunosuppression, raised blood lipids and raised blood sugar. These have made researchers cautious about its use in people and have slowed clinical trials of mTOR inhibitors for age-related disease.

=== Metformin ===
The diabetes drug metformin has been associated with lower mortality in clinical and observational studies. It has also been associated with lower rates of several age-related diseases, including cardiovascular disease, cancer, Alzheimer's disease and mild cognitive impairment. Geroscientists designed the Targeting Aging with Metformin (TAME) trial as a double-blind, placebo-controlled study. Its main outcome is how long participants go before a cardiovascular event, cancer, cognitive decline, dementia or death. TAME was also meant to serve as a model for later trials of other approved drugs repurposed against ageing.

=== NAD^{+} precursors ===
The nicotinamide adenine dinucleotide (NAD^{+}) precursors most often tested in people are nicotinamide riboside and nicotinamide mononucleotide. Nicotinamide riboside is sometimes combined with pterostilbene. A 2023 review of oral supplementation trials found that these compounds appear safe and well tolerated. They can raise levels of NAD^{+} and related metabolites in several tissues. However, the trials have mostly been small and have used widely varying doses and durations. Several randomized controlled trials found that nicotinamide riboside did not improve insulin sensitivity, energy expenditure or exercise capacity.

=== Senolytics ===
Senolytics, drugs that selectively remove senescent cells, were first described in 2015. Early candidates included dasatinib, a cancer drug in clinical use since 2006. They also included the plant flavonoids quercetin and fisetin, which occur in fruit and other foods. Positive results in animal studies led to early-phase human trials, some of which have reported results. A 2022 review advised that senolytics should not be recommended to prevent or treat disease, in clinical practice or over the counter. It said this should hold until carefully monitored, rigorous trials show them to be safe and effective.

== See also ==
- Anti-aging product
- Growth hormone
- Senolytic
