= Human umbilical vein endothelial cell =

HUVECs are cells derived from the endothelium of veins from umbilical cords

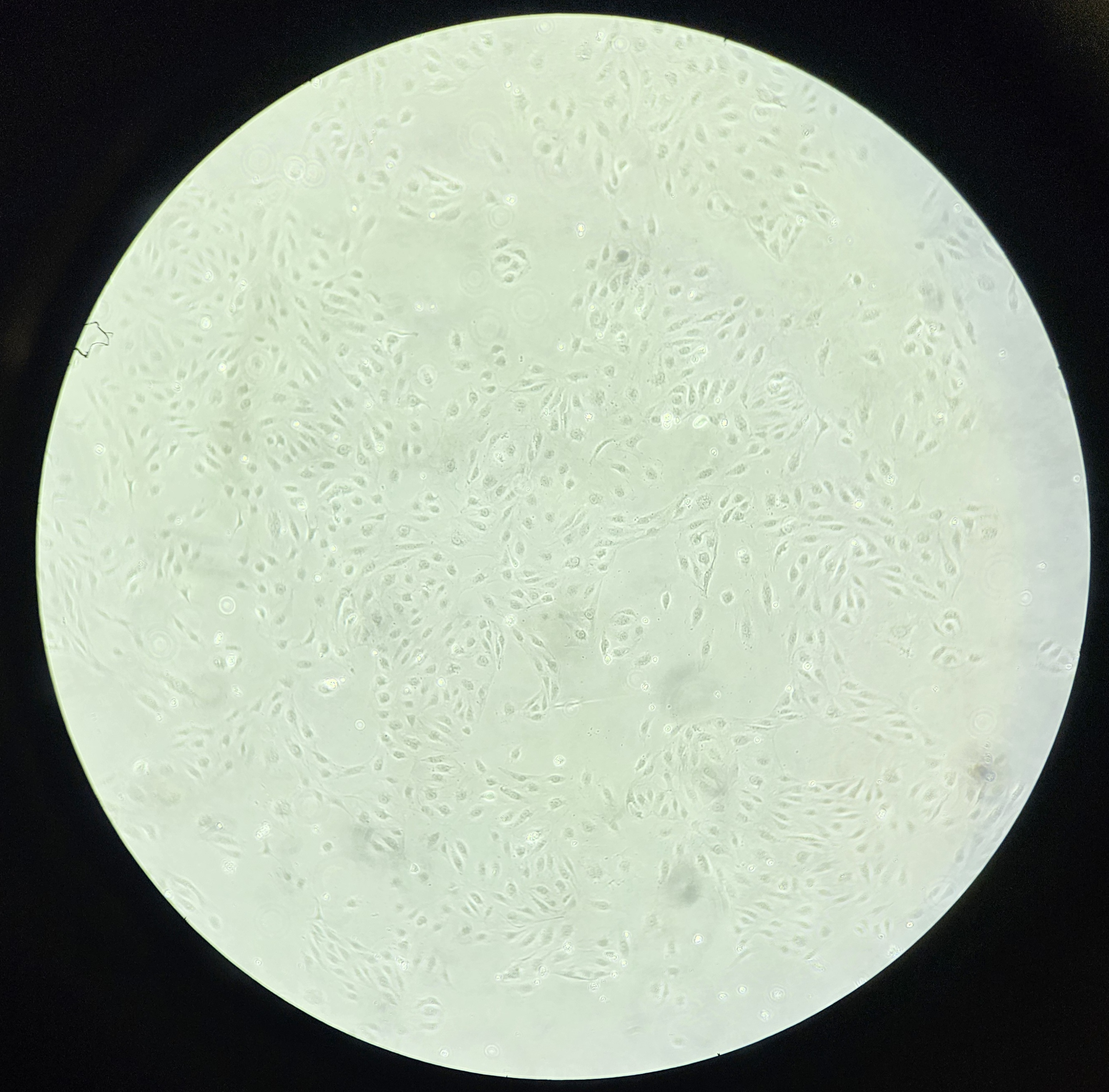
Human umbilical vein endothelial cells pictured down a microscope at 200x zoom

Human umbilical vein endothelial cells (HUVECs) are cells derived from the endothelium of veins from the umbilical cord. They are used as a laboratory model system for the study of the function and pathology of endothelial cells (e.g., angiogenesis). They are used due to their low cost, and simple techniques for isolating them from umbilical cords, which are normally resected after childbirth. HUVECs were first isolated and cultured in vitro in the 1970s by Jaffe and others. HUVECs can be easily made to proliferate in a laboratory setting. Like human umbilical artery endothelial cells they exhibit a cobblestone phenotype when lining vessel walls.

Inhibition of the sirtuin protein sirtuin 1 (SIRT1) in HUVECs has been shown to induce cellular senescence. Conversely, overexpression of SIRT1 in HUVECs has been shown to inhibit cellular senescence. The polyphenol quercetin has been found to be an effective senolytic for inducing the death of senescent HUVECs.

Microscopic image of the keratin cytoskeleton of a HUVEC cell.
