= Navitoclax =

Names
- Preferred IUPAC name 4-(4-{[2-(4-Chlorophenyl)-5,5-dimethylcyclohex-1-en-1-yl]methyl}piperazin-1-yl)-N-(4-{[(2R)-4-(morpholin-4-yl)-1-(phenylsulfanyl)butan-2-yl]amino}-3-(trifluoromethanesulfonyl)benzene-1-sulfonyl)benzamide
- Other names ABT263; ABT-263

Identifiers
CAS Number	923564-51-6
3D model (JSmol)	Interactive image
ChEBI	CHEBI:131174
ChemSpider	21864722
PubChem CID	24978538
UNII	XKJ5VVK2WD
CompTox Dashboard (EPA)	DTXSID2042640
- InChI: InChI=1S/C47H55ClF3N5O6S3/c1-46(2)20-18-42(34-8-12-37(48)13-9-34)36(31-46)32-55-22-24-56(25-23-55)39-14-10-35(11-15-39)45(57)53-65(60,61)41-16-17-43(44(30-41)64(58,59)47(49,50)51)52-38(19-21-54-26-28-62-29-27-54)33-63-40-6-4-3-5-7-40/h3-17,30,38,52H,18-29,31-33H2,1-2H3,(H,53,57)/t38-/m1/s1 Key: JLYAXFNOILIKPP-KXQOOQHDSA-N; InChI=1/C47H55ClF3N5O6S3/c1-46(2)20-18-42(34-8-12-37(48)13-9-34)36(31-46)32-55-22-24-56(25-23-55)39-14-10-35(11-15-39)45(57)53-65(60,61)41-16-17-43(44(30-41)64(58,59)47(49,50)51)52-38(19-21-54-26-28-62-29-27-54)33-63-40-6-4-3-5-7-40/h3-17,30,38,52H,18-29,31-33H2,1-2H3,(H,53,57)/t38-/m1/s1 Key: JLYAXFNOILIKPP-KXQOOQHDBT
- SMILES: CC1(CCC(=C(C1)CN2CCN(CC2)C3=CC=C(C=C3)C(=O)NS(=O)(=O)C4=CC(=C(C=C4)N[C@H](CCN5CCOCC5)CSC6=CC=CC=C6)S(=O)(=O)C(F)(F)F)C7=CC=C(C=C7)Cl)C

Properties
Chemical formula	C_{47}H_{55}ClF_{3}N_{5}O_{6}S_{3}
Molar mass	974.61 g·mol^{−1}

Pharmacology
ATC code	L01XX78 (WHO)
- Except where otherwise noted, data are given for materials in their standard state (at 25 °C [77 °F], 100 kPa). Infobox references

Navitoclax (previously ABT-263) is an experimental orally active anti-cancer drug, which is a Bcl-2 inhibitor similar in action to obatoclax.

== Mechanism of action ==
In addition to Bcl-2, navitoclax also inhibits the related Bcl-xL and Bcl-w proteins. Because navitoclax inhibits Bcl-xL, it reduces platelet lifespan, causing thrombocytopenia, and this makes it dose-limiting. A 2020 article published in Aging Cell details the synthesis of Nav-Gal (navitoclax-galactose), a novel prodrug via galacto-conjugation of navitoclax and its superiority. The prodrug reduces thrombocytopenia in treated mice at therapeutically effective doses, as well as apoptosis of platelets in human blood samples treated ex vivo. Nav-Gal is efficient for selective senolysis and is passively taken up by both non-senescent and senescent cells.

== Effects against senescent cells ==
In animal studies, navitoclax was found to be a senolytic agent, inducing apoptosis in senescent, but not non-senescent cells. Oral administration of navitoclax (ABT-263) to either sublethally irradiated or normally aged mice reduced senescent cells, including senescent bone marrow hematopoietic stem cells and senescent muscle stem cells. This depletion mitigated total-body irradiation-induced premature aging of the hematopoietic system and rejuvenated the aged hematopoietic stem cells and muscle stem cells in normally aged mice.

On September 19, 2018, an article was published in Nature about using navitoclax to kill senescent glial cells in mice. The drug had a protective effect against memory loss in mice genetically engineered to simulate Alzheimer's disease.

On December 3, 2024, an article was published in Aging detailing a study investigating the effects of topical navitoclax (ABT-263) on aged mouse skin. It examined whether eliminating senescent cells could improve wound healing. In the study, 24-month-old mice were treated with topical navitoclax (ABT-263) for five days. The treatment reduced the expression of senescence markers p16 and p21 and decreased the number of SA-β-gal– and p21-positive cells compared with DMSO controls. Navitoclax (ABT-263) application also induced a transient inflammatory response and macrophage infiltration. Bulk RNA sequencing revealed upregulation of genes involved in wound-healing pathways, including inflammation, angiogenesis, collagen synthesis, and extracellular matrix remodeling. Mice pre-treated with navitoclax (ABT-263) exhibited faster wound closure, suggesting that topical senolytic treatment may enhance skin repair by reducing senescent cell burden.

== Clinical trials ==
The drug is currently under development by AbbVie.

Navitoclax is used as mono-therapy as well as in combination with chemotherapies (paclitaxel, docetaxel, gemcitabine, and irinotecan), olaparib, erlotinib, venetoclax, and rituximab in advanced hematological malignancies (in both pediatric and adult patients) and solid tumors including ovarian cancer, breast cancer, lung cancer.

Additionally, an ongoing global multi-center, randomized, open-label, phase 3 study evaluating efficacy and safety of navitoclax in combination with ruxolitinib versus best available therapy in adult patients with relapsed/refractory myelofibrosis was initiated on 31 August 2020. The study is expected to conclude in 2026.

== Antisclerotic ==
Not directly related to cancer, rather as a therapy for scleroderma, navitoclax appeared to reduce existing fibrosis through inducing apoptosis of myofibroblasts. Further research is required to elucidate the exact mechanisms and confirm studies.
