= YPEL3 =

Protein-coding gene in humans

Identifiers
- Aliases: YPEL3, yippee like 3
- External IDs: OMIM: 609724; MGI: 1913340; HomoloGene: 116010; GeneCards: YPEL3; OMA:YPEL3 - orthologs

Gene location (Human)
Chr.	Chromosome 16 (human)
Band	16p11.2	Start	30,092,314 bp
Band	16p11.2	End	30,096,915 bp

Gene location (Mouse)
Chr.	Chromosome 7 (mouse)
Band	7|7 F3	Start	126,776,955 bp
Band	7|7 F3	End	126,780,514 bp
RNA expression pattern
Bgee	Human / Mouse (ortholog); Top expressed in: right hemisphere of cerebellum; Brodmann area 9; right frontal lobe; blood; granulocyte; prefrontal cortex; cingulate gyrus; anterior cingulate cortex; amygdala; right lung / Top expressed in: granulocyte; primary visual cortex; superior frontal gyrus; perirhinal cortex; entorhinal cortex; dentate gyrus of hippocampal formation granule cell; CA3 field; blood; lip; muscle of thigh; More reference expression data
BioGPS	n/a
Gene ontology
Molecular function	metal ion binding
Cellular component	nucleus; nucleolus
Biological process	positive regulation of cellular senescence
Sources:Amigo / QuickGO
Orthologs
Species	Human	Mouse
Entrez	83719	66090
Ensembl	ENSG00000090238	ENSMUSG00000042675
UniProt	P61236	P61237
RefSeq (mRNA)	NM_001145524; NM_031477	NM_025347; NM_026875
RefSeq (protein)	NP_001138996; NP_113665	NP_079623; NP_081151; NP_001366222; NP_001366223; NP_001366224 NP_001366225; NP_001366226
Location (UCSC)	Chr 16: 30.09 – 30.1 Mb	Chr 7: 126.78 – 126.78 Mb
PubMed search
- Wikidata
View/Edit Human	View/Edit Mouse

Yippee-like 3 (Drosophila) is a protein that in humans is encoded by the YPEL3 gene. YPEL3 has growth inhibitory effects in normal and tumor cell lines. One of five family members (YPEL1-5), YPEL3 was named in reference to its Drosophila melanogaster orthologue. Initially discovered in a gene expression profiling assay of p53 activated MCF7 cells, induction of YPEL3 has been shown to trigger permanent growth arrest or cellular senescence in certain human normal and tumor cell types. DNA methylation of a CpG island near the YPEL3 promoter as well as histone acetylation may represent possible epigenetic mechanisms leading to decreased gene expression in human tumors.

== Gene location and protein structure ==
Human YPEL3 is located on the short arm of chromosome 16 (p1611.2) and covers 4.62kb from 30015754 to 30011130 on the reverse strand. The Drosophila Yippee protein was identified as a putative zinc finger motif containing protein exhibiting a high degree of conservation among the cysteines and histidines. Zinc fingers function as structural platforms for DNA binding.

== Nomenclature ==
YPEL3 was first identified as murine SUAP, named for small unstable apoptotic protein because of its apparent role in cellular growth inhibition via apoptosis when studied in myeloid precursor cell lines . SUAP later attained its current designation as YPEL3 (Yippee like three), after it was discovered to be one of five human genes possessing homology with the Drosophila Yippee protein.

== Discovery ==
The Drosophila Yippee protein was originally discovered in a yeast interaction trap screen when it was found to physically interact with Hyalophora cecropia Hemolin. After subsequent cloning and sequencing experiments Yippee was found to be a conserved gene family of proteins present in a diverse range of eukaryotic organisms, ranging from fungi to humans. When analyzed at the amino acid level, Drosophila melanogaster Yippee and YPEL1 displayed a high level of homology (76%). During later sequence analysis of human chromosome 22, researchers identified a gene family YPEL1-YPEL5, which had high homology with the Drosophila Yippee gene.

YPEL3’s role as a novel tumor suppressor and its involvement in cellular proliferation were discovered during experiments to investigate p53 dependent cell cycle arrest. While investigating the p53 tumor suppressor protein, microarray studies which targeted Hdmx and Hdm2, both p53 negative regulators, revealed YPEL3 as a potential p53 regulated gene in MCF7 breast cancer cells. Investigation into its function led to the discovery of YPEL3 being a novel protein whose growth suppressive activity is thought to be mediated through a cellular senescence pathway.

== Function ==
=== Regulation by p53 ===
p53 is a tumor suppressor protein encoded by the human gene TP53 whose function is to prevent unregulated cell growth. p53 can be activated in response to a wide variety of cellular stressors, both oncogenic and non-oncogenic. An important checkpoint in a complex pathway, activated p53 has been shown to bind DNA and transcriptionally regulate genes that can mediate a variety of cellular growth processes including DNA repair, growth arrest, cellular senescence and apoptosis. The importance of functioning p53 in the regulation of the cell cycle is evident in that 55% of human cancers exhibit p53 mutations.

YPEL3 was discovered to be a possible p53 target after a screen for such genes was performed in MCF7 breast cancer cells following RNAi knockdown of p53 negative inhibitors. In both human normal and tumor cell lines, YPEL3 has been shown to be a p53-inducible gene. Two putative p53 binding sites have been identified, one 1.3-Kbp 5' of the YPEL3 promoter and another upstream of the YPEL3 promoter.

=== Cellular senescence ===
As a part of the p53 pathway response and its anti-proliferation role, cellular senescence has gained attention for its working relationship with tumor suppressor genes. Characterized by the limited ability of cultured normal cells to divide, senescence has been shown to be triggered through oncogenic activation( premature senescence) as well as telomere shortening as the result of successive rounds of DNA replication (replicative senescence). Recognized hallmarks of cellular senescence include senescence associated(SA)beta galactosidase staining and the appearance of senescence-associated heterochromatic foci(SAHF) within the nuclei of senescent cells.

Although studies in murine myeloid precursor cell lines indicated YPEL3 to have a role in apoptosis, human YPEL3 failed to demonstrate an apoptotic response using sub-G1 or poly ADP ribose polymerase cleavage as accepted indicators of programmed cell death. YPEL3 has been shown to trigger premature senescence when studied in IMR90 primary human fibroblasts. Studies in U2OS osteosarcoma cells and MCF7 breast cancer cells have also demonstrated increased cellular senescence upon YPEL3 induction. As further possible evidence to its function, reduced expression of YPEL3 has been observed in ovarian, lung, and colon tumor cell lines.

=== Epigenetic modification ===
Epigenetics is the study of changes in gene activity that do not involve alterations to genetic code, or DNA. Instead, just above the genome sits various epigenetic markers which serve to provide instructions to activate or inactivate genes to varying degrees. This silencing or activation of genes has been recognized to play an important role in the differentiation of nascent cells and several human disease states including cancer. Unlike genetic mutations, epigenetic changes are considered reversible, although further study is needed.

Two common methods of epigenetic modification are DNA methylation and histone modification. Specifically, hypermethylation of CpG islands( guanine and cytosine rich spans of DNA) near the promoters of tumor suppressor genes have been documented in specific tumor cell lines. In the case of the tumor suppressors VHL (associated with von Hippel–Lindau disease), p16, hMLH1, and BRCA1(a gene associated with breast cancer susceptibility), hypermethylation of the CpG-island has been shown to be a method of gene inactivation.

Both histone acetylation and DNA methylation have been studied as possible epigenetic means of regulating YPEL3 expression. When studied in Cp70 ovarian carcinoma cells, hypermethylation of a CpG island immediately upstream of the YPEL3 promoter has been seen to down regulate YPEL3 expression. Hypermethylation seen in the promoters of tumor suppressor genes are cancer type specific, allowing each tumor type to be identifiable with an individual pattern. Such discoveries have led researchers to investigate epigenetic markers as potential diagnostic tools, prognostic factors, and indicators for the responsiveness to treatment of human cancers, although continued study is needed.
