= E4F1 =

Protein-coding gene in the species Homo sapiens

Identifiers
- Aliases: E4F1, E4F, E4F transcription factor 1
- External IDs: OMIM: 603022; MGI: 109530; GeneCards: E4F1
Enzyme activity
EC #	BRENDA	ExPASy	KEGG	MetaCyc
2.3.2.27	↗	↗	↗	↗

Gene location (Human)
Chr.	Chromosome 16 (human)
Band	16p13.3	Start	2,223,580 bp
Band	16p13.3	End	2,235,742 bp

Gene location (Mouse)
Chr.	Chromosome 17 (mouse)
Band	17 A3.3|17 12.39 cM	Start	24,662,752 bp
Band	17 A3.3|17 12.39 cM	End	24,689,287 bp
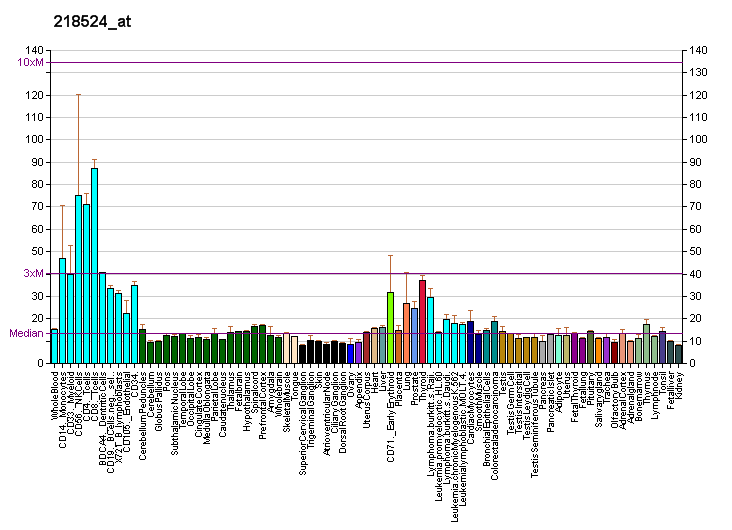
RNA expression pattern
Bgee	Human / Mouse (ortholog); Top expressed in: right hemisphere of cerebellum; sural nerve; right lobe of thyroid gland; granulocyte; left lobe of thyroid gland; pituitary gland; skin of leg; skin of abdomen; apex of heart; anterior pituitary / Top expressed in: granulocyte; neural layer of retina; muscle of thigh; lip; right kidney; superior frontal gyrus; urethra; morula; morula; ventricular zone; More reference expression data
BioGPS	More reference expression data
Gene ontology
Molecular function	DNA binding; RNA polymerase II transcription regulatory region sequence-specific DNA binding; transcription corepressor activity; DNA-binding transcription factor activity; transcription coactivator activity; metal ion binding; protein binding; DNA-binding transcription repressor activity, RNA polymerase II-specific; nucleic acid binding; cAMP response element binding; transferase activity; DNA-binding transcription factor activity, RNA polymerase II-specific
Cellular component	cytoplasm; spindle; nucleoplasm; nucleus
Biological process	regulation of transcription, DNA-templated; negative regulation of transcription by RNA polymerase II; transcription, DNA-templated; cell division; DNA replication; regulation of mitotic cell cycle, embryonic; protein ubiquitination; regulation of growth; cell cycle; cell population proliferation; viral process; regulation of cell cycle process; positive regulation of nucleic acid-templated transcription
Sources:Amigo / QuickGO
Orthologs
Databases	NCBI: entry; OMA: entry
Species	Human	Mouse
Entrez	1877	13560
Ensembl	ENSG00000167967	ENSMUSG00000024137
UniProt	Q66K89	Q8CCE9
RefSeq (mRNA)	NM_001288776; NM_001288778; NM_004424	NM_001301784; NM_007893; NM_001355708
RefSeq (protein)	NP_001275705; NP_001275707; NP_004415	NP_001288713; NP_031919; NP_001342637
Location (UCSC)	Chr 16: 2.22 – 2.24 Mb	Chr 17: 24.66 – 24.69 Mb
PubMed search
- Wikidata
View/Edit Human	View/Edit Mouse

Transcription factor E4F1 is a protein that in humans is encoded by the E4F1 gene.

== Function ==
The zinc finger protein encoded by this gene is one of several cellular transcription factors whose DNA-binding activities are regulated through the action of adenovirus E1A. A 50-kDa amino-terminal product is generated from the full-length protein through proteolytic cleavage. The protein is differentially regulated by E1A-induced phosphorylation. The full-length gene product represses transcription from the E4 promoter in the absence of E1A, while the 50-kDa form acts as a transcriptional activator in its presence.

== Interactions ==
E4F1 has been shown to interact with:

- P16,
- P53, and
- RB1
