= Immunosenescence =

Immune system deterioration brought on by aging

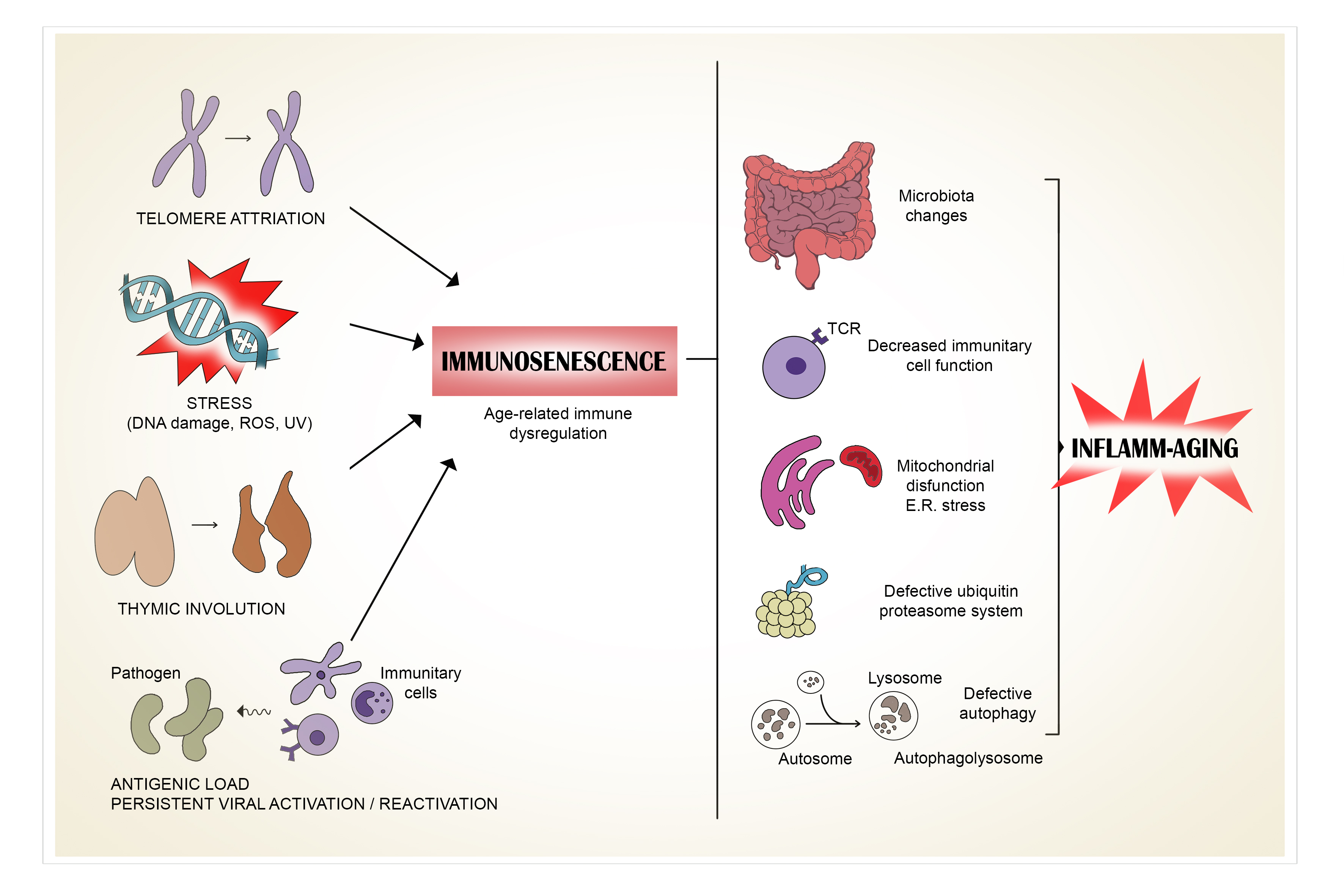
Immunosenescence

Immunosenescence is the gradual deterioration of the immune system, brought on by natural age advancement. It affects both innate and adaptive immunity, including changes in lymphocyte production, immune cell function, and inflammatory regulation. Immunosenescence involves both the host's capacity to respond to infections and the development of long-term immune memory. Age-associated immune deficiency is found in both long- and short-lived species as a function of their age relative to life expectancy rather than elapsed time.

Immunosenescence has been studied in animal models, including mice, marsupials, and monkeys. In humans, it is associated with increased rates of morbidity and mortality in older adults. Along with anergy and T-cell exhaustion, immunosenescence is among the major dysfunctional states of the immune system. Strategies to reverse immunosenescence and the mechanisms underlying immune system aging remain active areas of research.

Immunosenescence is not a random, deteriorative phenomenon. It instead appears to reflect an evolutionary pattern in reverse where there is a gradual loss of features that had been optimized for effective immunity earlier in life. Many of the parameters affected by immunosenescence are thought to be under genetic control.

== Age-associated decline in immune function ==
The mechanisms and functional consequences of aging in the immune system remain an active area of research. Senescence refers to replicative senescence from cell biology, which describes the condition when the upper limit of cell divisions (Hayflick limit) has been exceeded, and such cells commit apoptosis or lose their functional properties. In the immune system, there has been evidence that immune cells such as T lymphocytes display markers of senescence. However, immunosenescence refers more broadly to age-related changes in both adaptive and innate immune function and structure.

=== Adaptive immunity changes ===
Adaptive immunity is responsible for tailored, long-term immune response. Age-related changes in adaptive immunity affect both T and B lymphocytes.

==== T-cell changes ====
Thymic involution is the gradual shrinkage of the thymus gland with age and is considered to be a major contributor to adaptive immune aging. In humans, beginning early in life and accelerating during puberty, functional thymic tissue is progressively replaced with adipose (fat) tissue. This reduces the production of naive T cells and subsequently decreases T-cell receptor (TCR) diversity. As TCR diversity decrease, the range of antigens that the immune system's can recognize on antigen-presenting cells (APCs) is also limited. And as thymic output is reduced, overall T-cell numbers are instead maintained partly through peripheral homeostatic proliferation. This is a process in which existing T cells divide outside of the thymus to preserve cell numbers. While this compensatory mechanism helps maintain T-cell quantity, it does not generate new receptors. At the same time, antigen-experienced memory and highly differentiated T cells accumulate with age, partly due to repeated antigenic stimulation. Over time, the combination of thymic involution and the expansion of existing clones reduces TCR diversity in both naïve and memory T-cell populations.

Persistent viral infections can also shape how T-cell populations change with age. One virus that has been studied extensively in this context is cytomegalovirus (CMV). CMV is a member of the herpesvirus family and, once acquired, remains in the body for life in a latent state. In most healthy adults it causes few or no symptoms, but the immune system must continually monitor and control the infection. Over time, this ongoing immune surveillance promotes the expansion of CMV-specific memory T cells. In older individuals, these cells can occupy a large fraction of the total T-cell pool. As these CMV-specific clones expand, they reduce the relative diversity of the overall T-cell repertoire.

Taken together, these age-related alterations in T-cell production, diversity, and clonal expansion contribute to broader changes in immune function. As a result, older adults may become more vulnerable to infections that the immune system has not previously encountered. Aging of the immune system has also been associated with a greater risk of cancer, autoimmune disorders, and several other chronic health conditions.

==== B-cell changes ====
B lymphocytes normally respond to antigen exposure by proliferating and differentiating into antibody-secreting plasma cells. However, several aspects of B-cell biology change during aging. One major change is a reduction in the overall production of new B cells. This decline is linked to impaired development within the bone marrow, including a decrease in precursor populations such as pre-B cells. Because of this developmental slowdown, the number of naïve B cells entering the circulation gradually decreases.

Aging also affects how B cells function after activation. Studies have shown that antibodies produced by older B cells often have lower affinity for their target antigens. In addition, the efficiency of class-switch recombination tends to decline with age. Class-switch recombination is the mechanism that allows B cells to change the class of antibody they produce—for example switching from IgM to IgG or IgA—which is important for building strong and long-lasting immune protection.

When this process becomes less efficient, immune responses to new pathogens are weaker. This contributes to reduced protection against unfamiliar infections and can also lower the effectiveness of vaccines in older populations. Some subsets of memory B cells may also produce higher levels of inflammatory signaling molecules, suggesting they could contribute to the chronic low-grade inflammation frequently observed in aging individuals.

=== Innate immunity changes ===
The effects of immunosenescence are not limited to the adaptive immune system. Components of the innate immune system—our body's first line of defense against pathogens—also undergo age-related changes. One important factor involves hematopoietic stem cells (HSCs), which give rise to all blood and immune cells. As these stem cells age, their capacity for self-renewal declines and their differentiation patterns shift. In particular, aging HSCs tend to produce more cells of the myeloid lineage than lymphoid cells. This imbalance alters the overall composition of immune cells and may contribute to reduced immune responsiveness in older individuals.

Other cells:

- HSCs provide the regulated lifelong supply of leukocyte progenitors that eventually differentiate into specialized immune cells. With age, these cells gradually lose their self-renewal capacity. This is due to the accumulation of oxidative damage to DNA by aging and cellular metabolic activity and telomeric shortening.
- Decreased phagocytic capability in neutrophils, macrophages, and dendritic cells (DCs)
- Natural killer (NK) cells exhibit phenotypic changes that may lead to decline in cytotoxic ability. A shift within NK cell subpopulations may also be what leads to reduced proliferation and pathogen clearance

== T-cell biomarkers of age-dependent dysfunction ==
T cells' functional capacity is most influenced by aging effects. Age-related alterations are evident in all T-cell development stages, making them a significant factor in immunosenescence. T-cell function decline begins with the progressive involution of the thymus, which is the organ essential for T-cell maturation. This decline in turn reduces IL-2 production and reduction/exhaustion on the number of thymocytes (i.e. immature T cells), thus reducing peripheral naïve T cell output. Once matured and circulating throughout the peripheral system, T cells undergo deleterious age-dependent changes. This leaves the body practically devoid of virgin T cells, which makes it more prone to a variety of diseases.

- shift in the CD4+/CD8+ ratio
- the accumulation and clonal expansion of memory and effector T cells
- impaired development of CD4+ T follicular helper cells (specialized in facilitating peripheral B cell maturation, and the generation of antibody-producing plasma cells and memory B cells)
- deregulation of intracellular signal transduction capabilities
- diminished capacity to produce effector lymphokines
- shrinkage of antigen-recognition repertoire of T-cell receptor (TcR) diversity
- down-regulation of CD28 costimulatory molecules
- cytotoxic activity of Natural Killer T cells (NKTs) decreases due to reduction of the expression of cytotoxicity activating receptors (NKp30, NKp46, etc.) and (simultaneously) increase in the expression of the inhibitory (KIR, NKG2C, etc.) receptors of NK cells
- reduction of cytotoxic activity due to impaired expression of associated molecules such as IFN-γ, granzyme B or perforin
- impaired proliferation in response to antigenic stimulation
- accumulation and clonal expansion of memory and effector T cells
- hampered immune defences against viral pathogens, especially by cytotoxic CD8+ T cells
- Progressive accumulation of cytotoxic CD4⁺ T cells expressing EOMES, which may represent an adaptive mechanism that preserves tissue integrity and restrains senescent cell accumulation
- changes in cytokine profile, e.g., increased pro-inflammatory cytokines milieu present in the elderly (IL-6)
- increased PD-1 expression
- glycolysis as a preferential pathway of energetic metabolism - functionally impaired mitochondria produce ROS excessively
- presence of T cell-specific biomarkers of senescence (circular RNA100783, micro-RNAs MiR-181a)

== Challenges ==
Older adults frequently present with non-specific signs and symptoms, and clues of focal infection are often absent or obscured by chronic conditions. This complicates diagnosis and treatment.

=== Vaccination in older adults ===
Reduced vaccine efficacy in older people stems from their limited ability—relative to younger adults—to respond to immunization with novel, non-persistent pathogens and correlates with alterations in CD4:CD8 ratios and impaired dendritic cell function. Therefore, vaccination in earlier life stages seems more likely to be effective, although the duration of the effect varies by pathogen.

=== Rescue of the advanced-age phenotype ===
Removal of senescent cells with senolytics has been proposed as a means to enhance immunity during aging. Immune system aging in mice can be partially restrained by restoring thymus growth, which can be achieved by transplanting proliferative thymic epithelial cells from young mice. Metformin has been proven to moderate aging in preclinical studies. Its protective effect is probably caused primarily by impaired mitochondrial metabolism, particularly decreased reactive oxygen production, increased AMP:ATP ratio, and lower NAD/NADH ratio. Coenzyme NAD+ wanes in various tissues in an age-dependent manner; thus, redox potential associated changes seem to be critical in the aging process, and NAD+ supplements may have protective effects. Rapamycin, an antitumor and immunosuppressant, acts similarly.
