= DNA-SCARS =

DNA-SCARS (short for DNA segments with chromatin alterations reinforcing senescence) are nuclear substructures with persistent DNA damage and DNA damage response proteins found in senescent cells. DNA-SCARS are associated with PML nuclear bodies and the accumulation of activated ATM, ATR, CHK2 and p53 proteins. DNA-SCARS lack most of the characteristics of transient, reversible DNA damage foci, such as single-stranded DNA, active DNA synthesis, and DNA repair proteins RPA and RAD51. Telomere dysfunction-induced foci (TIF) are generally associated with DNA-SCARS.

Together with senescence-associated heterochromatin foci (SAHF), DNA-SCARS are one of the most prevalent nuclear markers of cellular senescence.

== History ==
DNA-SCARS were discovered by Judith Campisi and colleagues, who first described them in 2011, although most of their characteristics were previously known.
