= Nathaniel David =

American scientist and entrepreneur

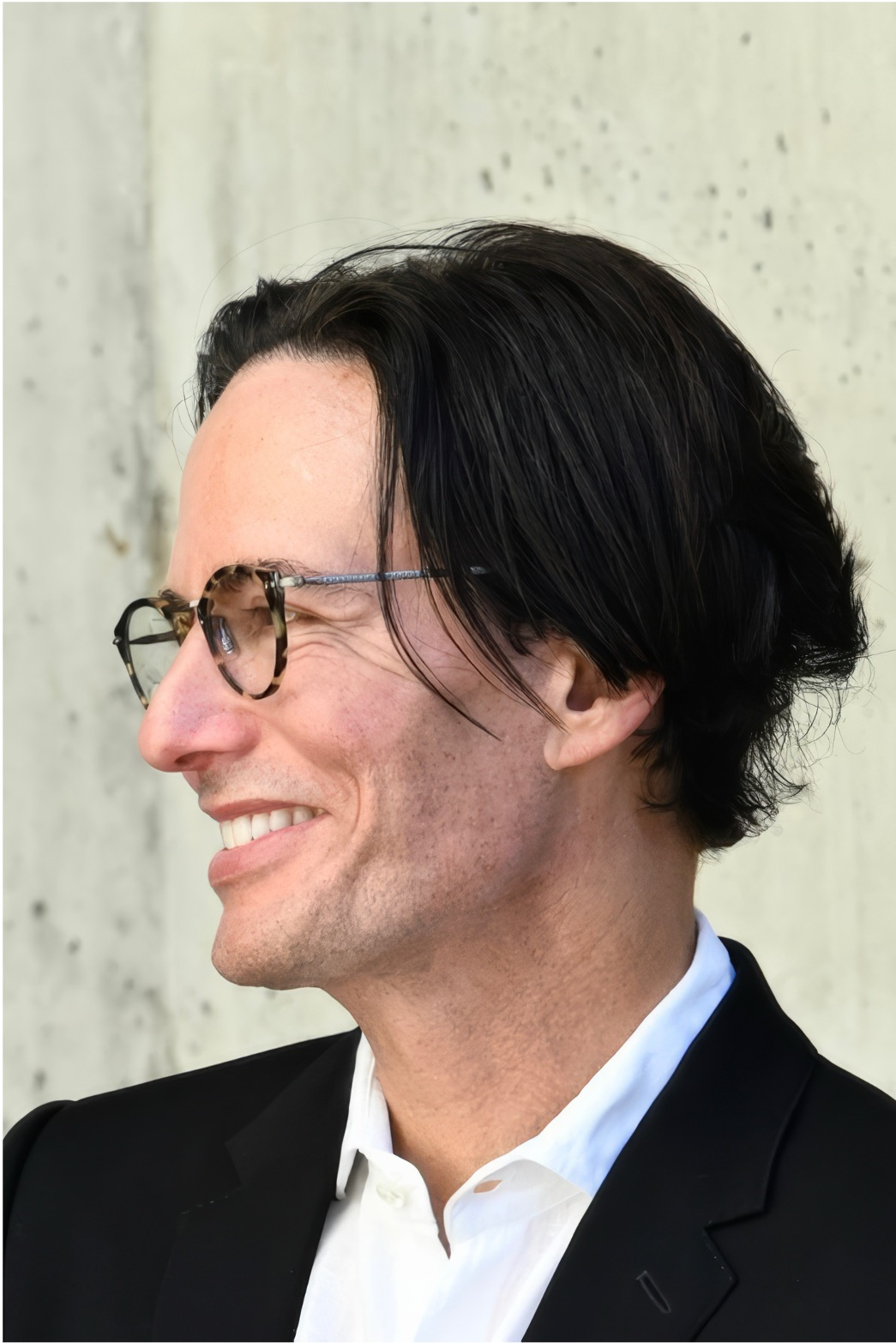
- Born: San Francisco, California, U.S.
- Education: Harvard University, University of California, Berkeley
- Known for: Kythera Biopharmaceuticals, Kybella, Jupiter Bioventures
- Awards: MIT Technology Review Young Innovators Under 35
- Scientific career
- Fields: Biotechnology
- Workplaces: Kythera Biopharmaceuticals, Unity Biotechnology, Jupiter Bioventures

Nathaniel David is an American scientist and biotechnology entrepreneur who has co-founded several life sciences companies that together have raised more than $1.5 billion in financing and contributed to the development of multiple FDA-approved medicines, including alogliptin, trelagliptin, gemigliptin, plazomicin, and deoxycholic acid.

== Education ==
David earned an A.B. in Biology from Harvard University and a Ph.D. in Molecular and Cellular Biology from University of California, Berkeley.

== Career ==
While completing his doctorate, he co-founded Syrrx in 1999. The company developed a high-throughput structural biology platform that used automation and miniaturization to accelerate protein structure determination. David was named to the MIT's list of Innovators Under 35, a list of top global innovators under the age of 35. Syrrx was acquired by Takeda Pharmaceutical Company in 2005, and its research contributed to the development of alogliptin, a diabetes drug approved by the FDA.

David later co-founded Achaogen, focused on developing treatments for antibiotic-resistant infections. Achaogen developed plazomicin, which was approved by the FDA for complicated urinary tract infections.

In 2005, David co-founded Kythera Biopharmaceuticals, where he served as Chief Science Officer. The company developed deoxycholic acid, the first FDA-approved injectable drug for reducing submental fat. Kythera went public in 2012 and was acquired by Allergan in 2015 for $2.1 billion.

In 2011, he also co-founded Unity Biotechnology.

In 2021, David co-founded Jupiter Bioventures with former National Cancer Institute director Ned Sharpless. Jupiter Bioventures is a venture foundry that supports the development of therapeutic companies based on emerging biological science. It launched with an initial fund of $70 million and focuses on areas such as oncology and immunology.
