= SERTAD1 =

Protein-coding gene in the species Homo sapiens

Identifiers
- Aliases: SERTAD1, SEI1, TRIP-Br1, SERTA domain containing 1, TRIPBR1
- External IDs: OMIM: 617850; MGI: 1913438; HomoloGene: 8365; GeneCards: SERTAD1; OMA:SERTAD1 - orthologs

Gene location (Human)
Chr.	Chromosome 19 (human)
Band	19q13.2	Start	40,421,589 bp
Band	19q13.2	End	40,425,992 bp

Gene location (Mouse)
Chr.	Chromosome 7 (mouse)
Band	7|7 A3	Start	27,186,335 bp
Band	7|7 A3	End	27,189,741 bp
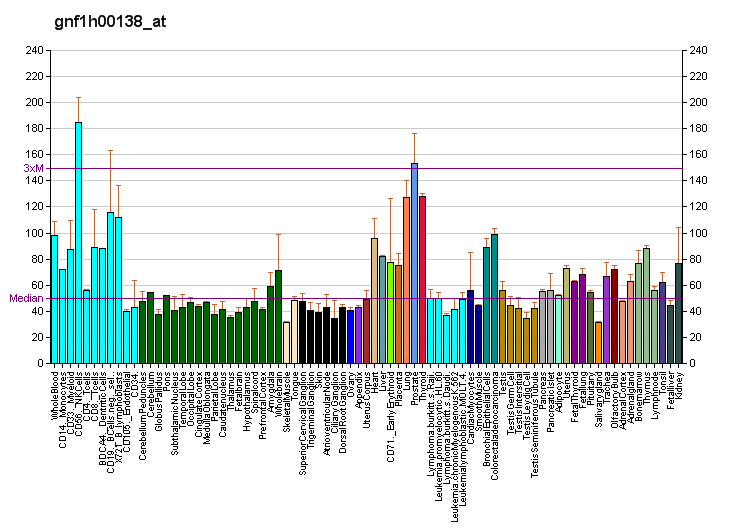

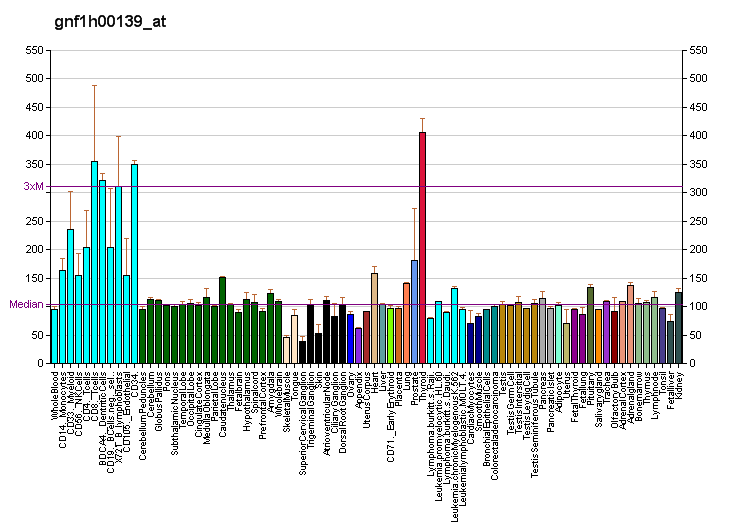
RNA expression pattern
Bgee	Human / Mouse (ortholog); Top expressed in: vena cava; amniotic fluid; lower lobe of lung; mucosa of ileum; saphenous vein; trachea; mucosa of pharynx; tibialis anterior muscle; pancreatic epithelial cell; gastric mucosa / Top expressed in: granulocyte; intestinal villus; ascending aorta; aortic valve; sciatic nerve; lip; gastric mucosa; mucous cell of stomach; endothelial cell of lymphatic vessel; epithelium of stomach; More reference expression data
BioGPS	More reference expression data
Gene ontology
Molecular function	protein binding
Cellular component	cytoplasm; nucleus
Biological process	positive regulation of transcription, DNA-templated; positive regulation of cell population proliferation; positive regulation of transcription by RNA polymerase II; transcription, DNA-templated; regulation of cyclin-dependent protein serine/threonine kinase activity; regulation of transcription, DNA-templated; negative regulation of cell growth
Sources:Amigo / QuickGO
Orthologs
Species	Human	Mouse
Entrez	29950	55942
Ensembl	ENSG00000197019	ENSMUSG00000008384
UniProt	Q9UHV2; Q53GC0	Q9JL10
RefSeq (mRNA)	NM_013376	NM_018820
RefSeq (protein)	NP_037508; NP_037508.2	NP_061290
Location (UCSC)	Chr 19: 40.42 – 40.43 Mb	Chr 7: 27.19 – 27.19 Mb
PubMed search
- Wikidata
View/Edit Human	View/Edit Mouse

SERTA domain-containing protein 1 is a protein that in humans is encoded by the SERTAD1 gene.

== Interactions ==
SERTAD1 has been shown to interact with:

- CREB-binding protein,
- Cyclin-dependent kinase 4, and
- P16.
