= Anirvan Ghosh =

American neuroscientist (born 1964)

- Born: 1964 (age 61–62); Bloomington, Indiana, U.S.
- Education: Caltech, Stanford University
- Scientific career
- Fields: Neuroscience
- Workplaces: University of California San Diego; Johns Hopkins School of Medicine; Harvard Medical; Stanford University; California Institute of Technology

Anirvan Ghosh (Bengali: অনির্বাণ ঘোষ) is an American neuroscientist and biotech executive.

Ghosh is a professional in the fields of neuroscience and biotechnology. Prior to his current role as CEO of Unity Biotechnology, he held senior positions at several academic institutions and companies. Ghosh served on the faculty of Johns Hopkins School of Medicine and as chair of neurobiology at UCSD, where he made significant contributions in the field of neuroscience in the areas of molecular mechanisms of synapse formation and activity-dependent development of neural circuits. From 2011 to 2016, he served as the global head of neuroscience discovery at F. Hoffmann-La Roche. Ghosh was founding CSO of E-Scape Bio from 2016 to 2017 and served as the head of research and early development at Biogen from 2017 to 2020. He was appointed CEO of Unity Biotechnology in 2020.

== Biography ==
Anirvan Ghosh, born in 1964 in Bloomington, Indiana, spent his formative years in Kanpur, India. After completing high school at Central School Kendriya Vidyalaya IIT Kanpur, he returned to the United States to pursue his undergraduate education at the California Institute of Technology. He graduated with a B.S. with honors in Physics from Caltech in 1985.

From 1985 to 1990, Ghosh pursued his graduate studies at Stanford University in the Neurosciences Graduate Program. Under the guidance of Carla J. Shatz, he discovered the critical role of subplate neurons in establishing connections in the mammalian brain. In 1991, he obtained his Ph.D. in Neurobiology from Stanford University. Ghosh then undertook postdoctoral training at Harvard Medical School, working alongside Michael E. Greenberg. During this time, he explored the regulation of differentiation by extracellular signals and how calcium regulation of BDNF expression can affect neuronal survival.

In 1995, Ghosh joined the Department of Neuroscience at Johns Hopkins School of Medicine. While at Johns Hopkins his laboratory cloned CREST as a calcium-regulated transcription factor and showed that it plays a critical role in brain development. In 2003 he was recruited to UCSD as the Stephen Kuffler Professor and served as chair of neurobiology in the Division of Biological Sciences. Work from Ghosh and his colleagues at UCSD established the role Leucine-rich Repeat (LRR) proteins in the development and function of synaptic connections.

In 2011, Ghosh was recruited to Roche to serve as the global head of neuroscience discovery. He subsequently served as head of research and early development at Biogen from 2017 to 2020. Ghosh was appointed CEO of UNITY Biotechnology in 2020, a company focused on developing therapies to slow, halt, or reverse diseases of aging.

== Major publications ==
- Ghosh, A., A. Antonini, S.K. McConnell and C.J. Shatz (1990). Requirement for subplate neurons in the formation of thalamocortical connections. Nature 347: 179-181
- Ghosh, A. and C.J. Shatz (1992). Involvement of subplate neurons in the formation of ocular dominance columns. Science 255:1441-1443.
- Ghosh, A., J. Carnahan and M.E. Greenberg (1994). Requirement for BDNF in activity-dependent survival of cortical neurons. Science 263:1618-1623.
- Ghosh, A. and M.E. Greenberg (1995). Distinct roles for bFGF and NT3 in the regulation of cortical neurogenesis. Neuron 15:89-103.
- Polleux, F., R.J. Giger, D.D. Ginty, A.L. Kolodkin, and A. Ghosh (1998). Patterning of cortical efferent projections by semaphorin-neuropilin interactions. Science 282:1904-1906.
- Polleux, F., T. Morrow and A. Ghosh (2000). Semaphorin 3A is a chemoattractant for developing cortical dendrites. Nature 404:567-573.
- Aizawa, H., Hu, S-C, Bobb, K., Balakrishnan, K., Ince, G., Gurevich, I., Cowan, M., and A. Ghosh (2004). Dendrite development regulated by CREST, a calcium-regulated transcription activator. Science 303:197-202.
- Qiu, Z. and A. Ghosh (2008) A calcium-dependent switch in a CREST-BRG1 complex regulates activity-dependent gene expression. Neuron 60:775-787.
- Sylwestrak, E and A. Ghosh (2012) Elfn1 regulates target-specific release probability at CA1-interneuron synapses. Science 338:536-540.
