= Unity Biotechnology =

American biotechnology company

Unity Biotechnology, Inc.
- Type: Public
- Traded as: Nasdaq: UBX; Russell 2000 component
- Industry: Biotechnology, Pharmaceutical
- Predecessor: Forge, Inc.
- Founded: 2011; 15 years ago in California, U.S.
- Founders: Judith Campisi; Jan van Deursen; Nathaniel David; Daohong Zhou
- Defunct: September 26, 2025
- Fate: Liquidation
- Headquarters: South San Francisco, California, United States
- Number of employees: 70 (2018)
- Website: unitybiotechnology.com

Unity Biotechnology, Inc. was a publicly traded American biotechnology company that develops drugs that target senescent cells. The company ceased operations in 2025.

== History ==
Unity BioTechnologies, a company backed by Jeff Bezos and PayPal co-founder Peter Thiel, was co-founded in March 2009 by Nathaniel David, Jan Van Deursen, Judith Campisi, and Daohong Zhou.

The company was founded under the name Forge, Inc., but changed its name to Unity BioTechnologies in January 2015.

Anirvan Ghosh joined Unity in 2020 as the company’s CEO. That same year, Nathaniel stepped down as president but remained a member of the board.

On May 3, 2018, the company went public on the Nasdaq exchange, raising $85 million at a market capitalization of $700 million. Unity Biotechnology shares dropped 60% on August 17, 2020, after the company reported disappointing results from a clinical trial involving its then lead drug candidate, UBX0101, in patients with moderate-to-severe painful osteoarthritis.

== Products ==
The company's products in development include UBX1325, which targets Bcl-xL, a mechanism to eliminate senescent cells in age-related eye diseases (in Phase 2 clinical trials for diabetic macular edema as of October 2023). In July 2022, the company reported positive results from its Phase 1 study. In April 2023, the company then reported results from its Phase 2 study demonstrating that a single injection of UBX1325 resulted in a statistically significant and clinically meaningful improvement in vision through 48 weeks. They also include UBX 1967, a preclinical product targeting ophthalmologic diseases. Both products are senolytic medicines.

== See also ==
- Senolytics
- Calico
