= Obatoclax =

Names
- IUPAC name 2-(2-((3,5-Dimethyl-1H-pyrrol-2-yl)methylene)-3-methoxy-2H-pyrrol-5-yl)-1H-indole
- Other names GX15-070

Identifiers
CAS Number	803712-67-6; 803712-79-0 (mesylate)
3D model (JSmol)	Interactive image
ChemSpider	24539359
PubChem CID	11404337; 16681698 (mesylate)
UNII	QN4128B52A; 39200FJ43J (mesylate)
- InChI: InChI=1S/C20H19N3O/c1-12-8-13(2)21-16(12)10-19-20(24-3)11-18(23-19)17-9-14-6-4-5-7-15(14)22-17/h4-11,21-22H,1-3H3/b19-10+
- SMILES: Cc1cc([nH]c1/C=C/2\C(=CC(=N2)c3cc4ccccc4[nH]3)OC)C

Properties
Chemical formula	C_{20}H_{19}N_{3}O
Molar mass	317.392 g·mol^{−1}
- Except where otherwise noted, data are given for materials in their standard state (at 25 °C [77 °F], 100 kPa). Infobox references

Obatoclax mesylate, also known as GX15-070, is an experimental drug for the treatment of various types of cancer. It was discovered by Gemin X, which was acquired by Cephalon, which has since been acquired by Teva Pharmaceuticals. Several Phase II clinical trials were completed that investigated use of obatoclax in the treatment of leukemia, lymphoma, myelofibrosis, and mastocytosis.

== Mechanism of action ==
Obatoclax is an inhibitor of the Bcl-2 family of proteins. This inhibition induces apoptosis in cancer cells, preventing tumor growth. Solubility has been an issue in the development of the drug.

== Clinical trials ==
Clinical trial results have been published for treatment of acute myeloid leukemia, small cell lung cancer, Hodgkin's lymphoma, and myelodysplastic syndromes.

Teva halted a phase III trial in patients with lung cancer before it had begun, citing "business decisions" as the reason.

== See also ==
- Navitoclax
