= Senolytic =

Type of molecule that may be able to induce death of senescent cells

A senolytic (from the words senescence and -lytic, "decomposition or breakdown") is among a class of small molecules under basic research to determine if they can selectively induce death of senescent cells and improve health in humans. A goal of this research is to discover or develop agents to delay, prevent, alleviate, or reverse age-related diseases. Removal of senescent cells with senolytics has been proposed as a method of enhancing immunity during aging.

A related concept is "senostatic", which means to suppress senescence.

== Research ==
Possible senolytic agents are under preliminary research, including some which are in early-stage human trials. The majority of candidate senolytic compounds are repurposed anti-cancer molecules, such as the chemotherapeutic drug dasatinib and the experimental small molecule navitoclax.

Soluble urokinase plasminogen activator surface receptor have been found to be highly expressed on senescent cells, leading researchers to use chimeric antigen receptor T cells to eliminate senescent cells in mice.

According to reviews, it is thought that senolytics can be administered intermittently while being as effective as continuous administration. This could be an advantage of senolytic drugs and decrease adverse effects, for instance circumventing potential off-target effects.

=== Senolytic candidates ===
Hypothetical candidates for senolytics based on early-stage research
Medication/target	Description	Tests as senolytic have been conducted in ...					
Medication/target	Description	human cell lines in vitro	mice models	xenograft model	phase I trial	phase II trial	phase III trial
FOXO4-related peptides	FOXO4 binding to p53 protein retains it in the nucleus, which prevents it from interacting with mitochondria in the cytosol where it would activate caspases, leading to apoptosis (programmed cell death). Instead, retention of p53 in the nucleus by FOXO4 promotes cellular senescence. A peptide that binds with FOXO4 disrupts the p53-FOXO4 interaction, releasing p53 into the cytosol and triggering cell death.	Yes	Yes				
BCL-2 inhibitors	Inhibitors of different members of the bcl-2 family of anti-apoptotic proteins. Studies of cell cultures of senescent human umbilical vein endothelial cells have shown that both fisetin and quercetin induce apoptosis by inhibition of the anti-apoptotic protein Bcl-xL (a bcl-2 family member).	Yes					
Src inhibitors	Src tyrosine kinase inhibitors: dasatinib – see "Combination of dasatinib and quercetin" below						
USP7 inhibitors	Inhibitors of USP7 (ubiquitin-specific processing protease 7)	Yes	Yes				
Dasatinib and Quercetin (D+Q)	Combination of dasatinib and quercetin	Yes	Yes		Yes		
Fisetin		Yes	Yes				
Navitoclax			xenograft	Yes			
SSK1	Senescence-specific killing compound 1: A gemcitabine (a cytotoxic chemotherapeutic) prodrug that is activated by lysosomal β-galactosidase (a common senescence marker)		Yes				
BIRC5 knockout	Crispr/Cas9 BIRC5 Gene Knockout. Crispr/Cas9 is used to trigger apoptosis in relation to a specified gene sequence such as a cancer gene sequence or damage marker sequences.	Yes					
GLS1 inhibitors	Target the enzyme kidney-type glutaminase 1 (GLS1). Senescent cells have a low pH due to their high lysosomal content and leaking lysosomal membranes. This low pH forms the basis of senescence-associated beta-galactosidase (SA-β-gal) staining of senescent cells. To help neutralize their low pH, senescent cells produce high levels of GLS1; inhibiting the activity of this enzyme exposes senescent cells to unsurvivably severe internal acidity, leading to cell death.	Yes					
Anti-GPNMB vaccine	Glycoprotein nonmetastatic melanoma protein B (GPNMB). A protein that enrich senescent cells studied as molecular target for a senolytic vaccine in mice.		Yes				
Cardiac glycosides		Yes	xenograft	Yes			
25-hydroxycholesterol (25HC)	25-hydroxycholesterol targets CRYAB in multiple human and mouse cell types	Yes	Yes				
Procyanidin C1		Yes	Yes				
EF-24		Yes					
HSP90 inhibitors							
CUDC-907							

== Senomorphics ==
Senolytics eliminate senescent cells whereas senomorphics – with candidates such as Apigenin, Rapamycin and rapalog Everolimus – modulate properties of senescent cells without eliminating them, suppressing phenotypes of senescence, including the SASP.

== See also ==
- Autophagy
- Biogerontology
- DNA repair § Senescence and apoptosis
- Geroprotector
- Hsp90
- Immunosenescence
- Invariant NKT (iNKT) cells
- Klotho (biology) § Effects on aging
- Life extension
- Senescence-associated beta-galactosidase, used as a biomarker
- Senotherapy
- Sirtuin-activating compound
- Unity Biotechnology
- Venetoclax
- YPEL3 § Cellular senescence
