= Mir-181 microRNA precursor =

mir-181 microRNA precursor
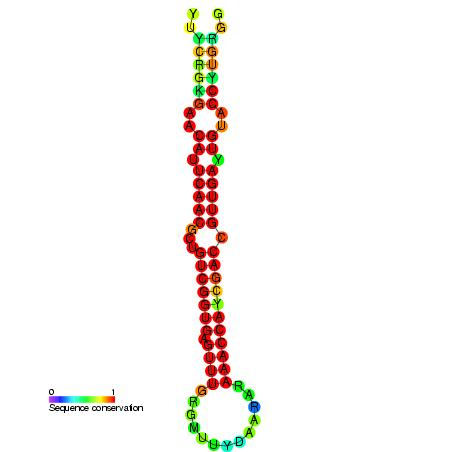
- Predicted secondary structure and sequence conservation of mir-181

Identifiers
- Symbol: miR-181
- Rfam: RF00076
- miRBase: MI0000269
- miRBase family: MIPF0000007

Other data
- RNA type: Gene; miRNA
- Domain: Eukaryota
- GO: GO:0035195 GO:0035068
- SO: SO:0001244
- PDB structures: PDBe

In molecular biology miR-181 microRNA precursor is a small non-coding RNA molecule. MicroRNAs (miRNAs) are transcribed as ~70 nucleotide precursors and subsequently processed by the RNase-III type enzyme Dicer to give a ~22 nucleotide mature product. In this case the mature sequence comes from the 5' arm of the precursor. They target and modulate protein expression by inhibiting translation and / or inducing degradation of target messenger RNAs. This new class of genes has recently been shown to play a central role in malignant transformation. miRNA are downregulated in many tumors and thus appear to function as tumor suppressor genes. The mature products miR-181a, miR-181b, miR-181c or miR-181d are thought to have regulatory roles at posttranscriptional level, through complementarity to target mRNAs. miR-181 has been predicted or experimentally confirmed in a wide number of vertebrate species such as rat, zebrafish, and pufferfish (see below) (MIPF0000007).

== Expression ==
It has been shown that miR-181 is preferentially expressed in the B-lymphoid cells of mouse bone marrow, but also in the retina and brain. In humans, this microRNA is involved in the mechanisms of immunity, and in many different cancers (see below) it was found to be expressed at a particularly low level.

== Genome location ==
Human
miR-181a1 and miR-181b1 are clustered together and located on the chromosome 1 (37.p5), miR-181a2 and miR-181b2 are clustered together and located on the chromosome 9 (37.p5). miR-181c and miR-181d are clustered together and located on the chromosome 19 (37.p5).

== Organisms ==
miR-181 family are present in vertebrates and nematodes (this list is not exhaustive):

- lizard (Anolis carolinensis),
- cow (Bos taurus),
- common carp (Cyprinus carpio),
- dog (Canis familiaris),
- Chinese hamster (Cricetulus griseus),
- zebrafish (Danio rerio),
- horse (Equus caballus),
- the pufferfish (Fugu rubripes),
- chicken (Gallus gallus),
- gorilla (Gorilla gorilla),
- woolly monkey (Lagothrix lagotricha),
- short-tailed opossum (Monodelphis domestica),
- rhesus macaque (Macaca mulatta),
- mouse (Mus musculus),
- pig-tailed macaque (Macaca nemestrina),
- platypus (Ornithorhynchus anatinus),
- medaka (Oryzias latipes),
- sea lamprey (Petromyzon marinus),
- bonobo (Pan paniscus),
- orangutan (Pongo pygmaeus),
- chimpanzee (Pan troglodytes),
- rat (Rattus norvegicus),
- tasmanian devil (Sarcophilus harrisii),
- wild boar (Sus scrofa),
- white-lipped tamarin (Saguinus labiatus),
- zebra finch (Taeniopygia guttata),
- tetraodon (Tetraodon nigroviridis),
- western clawed frog (Xenopus tropicalis),
- human (Homo sapiens).

== miR-181 ==
=== Chronic lymphocytic leukemia ===
miR-181 may have a regulatory role with tumor suppressors genes of the human chromosome 1. It has been shown that the Tcl1 oncogene is a target of miR-181a in an inhibition relation (downregulated) that would result in an action on the tumor cell growth process. miR-181 expression has a reverse correlation with Tcl1 protein expression.

=== Neuroblastoma ===
mir-181 a and b are over-expressed and act as bad prognosis maker of aggressive neuroblastoma (Stage 4) as compare to low grade stage (Stage 1;2;3 and 4S) whereas mir-181 c and d isoforms are not. In these conditions, they regulate the tumor suppressor gene CDON.

=== Myoblast differentiation ===
It has been shown that miR-181 targets the homeobox protein Hox-A11 and participates in establishing muscle tissue downregulating it (a repressor of the differentiation process in mammalians and lower organisms).

=== Breast cancer ===
miR-181a, miR-181b, miR-181c and miR-181d are activated by the human gene ERBB2, located on the chromosome 17. The expression of miR-181c is relevant to characterize a Breast cancer form, the HER2/neu.
miR-181 is also activated by the small molecule tamoxifen. One selective modulators of estrogen receptor having specific activities of tissue. Tamoxifen acts as an anti-estrogen (inhibitor) in breast tissue, but as an estrogen (stimulating agent) in cholesterol metabolism, bone density, and the proliferation of endometrial cells. miR-181 could acquire a resistance to tamoxifen, the drug is successfully used to treat women with estrogen receptor-positive breast cancer.

=== Acute myeloid leukemia ===
Downregulation of miR-181 family contributes to aggressive leukemia phenotype through mechanisms related to the activation pathways of innate immunity mediated by toll-like receptors TLR2, TLR4, TLR7 and TLR8 and interleukin-1β IL1B (humans on chromose 2).

=== Glioblastoma ===
miR-181a, miR-181b, and miR-181c, which are down-regulated in glioblastoma. miR-181b is downregulated in glioma samples compared with the normal brain tissue. It is suggested that the downregulation of miR-181 may play a role in the development of cancer. It is shown that transfection of miR-181a and miR-181b triggers growth inhibition, apoptosis and inhibits invasion. In addition, the expression of miR-181a was found to be inversely correlated with tumor grading while miR-181b was uniformly downregulated in gliomas with different grades of malignancy.

=== Glioma ===
It has been shown that downregulated miR-181a and miR-181b were also involved in the oncogenesis of gliomas. miR-181a and miR-181b function as tumor suppressors that cause inhibition of growth, induce apoptosis and inhibit invasion of glioma cells. In addition, the tumor suppressive effect of miR-181b in glioma cells was apparent that the effect of miR-181a. These aberrant results suggest that downregulated miR-181a and miR-181b may be key factors that contribute to the occurrence in malignant human gliomas.

=== Multiple myeloma ===
MiRNA signature for multiple myeloma (MM) has been described, including miR-181a and miR-181b, which modulate the expression of proteins essential for the pathogenesis of myeloma. Xenograft studies using human MM cell lines treated with miR-181a and miR-181b antagonists resulted in significant suppression of tumor growth in nude mice.

=== Papillary thyroid carcinoma ===
It was found that miR-181a and miR-181c are overexpressed in Papillary Thyroid Carcinoma tumors, sufficiently to successfully predict cancer status.

=== Hepatocellular carcinoma ===
It has been shown that conserved miR-181 family were upregulated in EpCAM+ AFP+ Hepatocellular carcinoma (HCC) cells and EpCAM+ HCC isolated from AFP+ tumors. In addition, miR-181 family members were highly expressed in the embryonic liver and isolated hepatic stem cells. Especially, inhibition of miR-181 leads to a reduction of the EpCAM+, the amount of HCC cells and initiate tumor capacity, whereas exogenous miR-181 expression in HCC cells resulted in an enrichment of EpCAM+ HCC cells. miR-181 could directly target hepatic transcriptional regulators of differentiation (like homeobox 2 CDX2 and 6 GATA proteins binding GATA6) and an inhibitor of Wnt / beta-catenin. It suggests that miR-181 may eradicate HCC.

== miR-181a ==
=== T-cell sensitivity ===
The increased expression of miR-181a in mature T cells increases susceptibility to peptide antigens, while inhibiting the expression of miR-181a in immature T cells reduces sensitivity and alters the both positive and negative selection. In addition, the quantitative regulation of the sensitivity of T cells by miR-181a allows for mature T cells recognize peptide inhibitor antagonists, like agonists. These effects are achieved in part by downregulation of multiple phosphatases, which leads to high levels of steadystate phosphorylated intermediates and reducing the threshold of T cell receptor signaling. The expression of miR-181a correlates with a greater sensitivity of immature T cells in T cells, suggesting that miR-181a acts as an antigen intrinsic sensitivity "rheostat" during the development of T cells.

=== Vascular development ===
It has been shown that miR-181a binds the 3' UTR of Prox1 leading to translation repression and transcript degradation. Prox1 is a homeobox transcription factor involved in development of the lymphatic endothelium.

=== Cerebellar neurodegeneration ===
miR-181a has a relatively broad expression pattern and is present in neurons in numerous parts of the mouse brain. miR-181a is essential for the survival of Purkinje cells and its absence leads to a slow degeneration of these cells.

=== Diabetes mellitus ===
It has been shown that there are significant correlations between the expression of miR-181a and both adipose tissue morphology and key metabolic parameters, including visceral fat area, HbA1c, fasting plasma glucose, and circulating leptin, adiponectin, interleukin-6. The expression of miR-181a may contribute to intrinsic differences between omental and subcutaneous adipose tissue.

=== Homozygous sickle cell disease ===
miR-181a is over-represented in the normal hemoglobin (HbAA) erythrocytes. miR-181a has been shown to play a role in the lineage differentiation in the hematopoietic system.

=== Breast cancer ===
miR-181a expression is associated with survival in triple negative breast cancer. Patients with low expression have lower probability of survival over time.

== miR-181b ==
=== Colorectal cancer ===
miR-181b was significantly overexpressed in tumors compared to normal colorectal samples, especially high miR-181b expression correlated with poor survival of only black patients with stage III colorectal cancers (Sequencing analysis revealed that miR-181b expression is strongly associated with mutation status of the tumor suppressor gene p53.

=== Cardiac hypertrophy ===
miR-181b is downregulated during hypertrophy, it causes a reduction in cardiomyocyte cell size.

=== Oral carcinoma ===
miR-181b expression was steadily increased and is associated with increased severity of lesions during the progression of the Oral Carcinoma. Overexpression of miR-181b may play an important role in malignant transformation.

=== Prostate cancer ===
miR-181b is downregulated in cancerous cells.

=== Adrenocortical carcinoma ===
Mir-210 has been suggested as a useful biomarker to distinguish adrenocortical carcinoma from adrenocortical adenoma.

== miR-181c ==
in Apoptosis

== miR-181d ==
=== Duchenne muscular dystrophy ===
miR-181d is dysregulated in Duchenne muscular dystrophy (DMD).

=== Nemaline myopathy ===
miR-181d is disregulated in nemaline myopathy (NM).
