= Human umbilical artery endothelial cells =

Human umbilical artery endothelial cells (HUAECs) are cells derived from the endothelium of arteries from the umbilical cord. They are used as a laboratory model system for the study of the function and pathology of endothelial cells (e.g., atherosclerosis). HUAECs have “cobblestone” morphology.
