= Senotherapy =

Basic research field

Senotherapeutics refers to therapeutic agents/strategies that specifically target cellular senescence. Senotherapeutics include emerging senolytic/senoptotic small molecules that specifically induce cell death in senescent cells and agents that inhibit the pro-inflammatory senescent secretome. Senescent cells can be targeted for immune clearance, but an ageing immune system likely impairs senescent cell clearance leading to their accumulation. Therefore, agents which can enhance immune clearance of senescent cells can also be considered as senotherapeutic.
