= Senescence-associated beta-galactosidase =

Hypothetical hydrolase enzyme

galactosidase, beta 1

Identifiers
- Symbol: GLB1
- Alt. symbols: SA-β-Gal
- NCBI gene: 2720
- HGNC: 4298
- OMIM: 611458
- RefSeq: NM_000404
- UniProt: P16278

Other data
- EC number: 3.2.1.23
- Locus: Chr. 3 p22.3
Search for
- Structures: Swiss-model
- Domains: InterPro

Senescence-associated beta-galactosidase (SA-β-gal or SABG) is a hypothetical hydrolase enzyme that catalyzes the hydrolysis of β-galactosides into monosaccharides. Senescence-associated beta-galactosidase, along with p16^{Ink4A}, is regarded to be a biomarker of cellular senescence.

Its existence was proposed in 1995 by Dimri et al. following the observation that when beta-galactosidase assays were carried out at pH 6.0, only cells in senescence state develop staining. They proposed a cytochemical assay based on production of a blue-dyed precipitate that results from the cleavage of the chromogenic substrate X-Gal, which stains blue when cleaved by galactosidase. Since then, even more specific quantitative assays were developed for its detection at pH 6.0.

The stain can be used on any tissue in which the enzyme stays active. However, fresh or frozen samples are generally considered the most reliable. The stain is mostly used in histology, but the reaction product can also be detected in other ways. These include transmission electron microscopy, nanoparticles and flow cytometry with fluorescent or colorimetric substrates. The amount of product formed depends on conditions such as the substrate, temperature and reaction time. For this reason, a well-standardised protocol with positive and negative controls is needed.

Today this phenomenon is explained by the overexpression and accumulation of the endogenous lysosomal beta-galactosidase specifically in senescent cells. Its expression is not required for senescence. Lysosomal β-galactosidase is active in most mammalian cells, whatever their age, and works best at about pH 4. Only when the assay is run at pH 6 does it discriminate between senescent and non-senescent cells. For this reason, staining at pH 6 came to be used as the standard method for identifying senescent cells. Even so, it remains one of the best-known and most widely used markers of senescent cells. Its specificity is limited, however, because it can reflect many kinds of lysosomal adaptation besides senescence. In cell culture, cells that are starved or confluent can stain positive. How specific the stain is in living tissue is not known. Some cells in living tissue, such as macrophages, naturally have high β-galactosidase activity because they contain many lysosomes. Reversal of senescence of human chondrocytes taken from patients undergoing total knee arthroplasty in in-vitro conditions through tissue engineering reported along with correlating evidence of P16 and P21 biomarkers reiterates this phenomenon.

Consensus guidelines published in 2024 on detecting senescent cells in tissue note that these cells vary widely. For this reason, the guidelines state that no single marker is enough to confirm senescence. The guidelines treat the cell-cycle inhibitors p21 and/or p16^{Ink4a} as primary markers. SA-β-gal and other lysosomal readouts are classed as auxiliary markers. They are useful alongside the primary markers but should not be the only evidence of senescence.
