= P16 =

Mammalian protein found in humans

CDKN2A
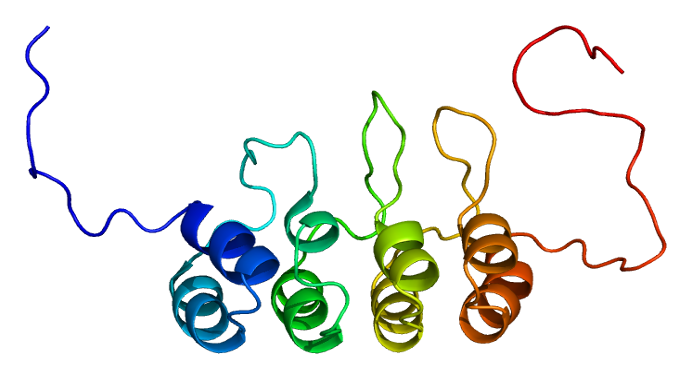

Identifiers
- Aliases: CDKN2A, CDK4I, CDKN2, CMM2, INK4, INK4A, MLM, MTS-1, MTS1, P14, P14ARF, P16, P16-INK4A, P16INK4, P16INK4A, P19, P19ARF, TP16, cyclin-dependent kinase inhibitor 2A, cyclin dependent kinase inhibitor 2A, Genes, p16, ARF.
- External IDs: OMIM: 600160; MGI: 104738; GeneCards: CDKN2A
Available structures
PDB	Ortholog search: PDBe RCSB
PDB	List of PDB id codes 2A5E, 1A5E, 1BI7, 1DC2,%%s1A5E, 1BI7, 1DC2, 2A5E

Gene location (Human)
Chr.	Chromosome 9 (human)
Band	9p21.3	Start	21,967,752 bp
Band	9p21.3	End	21,995,301 bp

Gene location (Mouse)
Chr.	Chromosome 4 (mouse)
Band	4 C4|4 42.15 cM	Start	89,192,708 bp
Band	4 C4|4 42.15 cM	End	89,212,890 bp
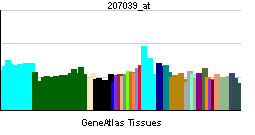

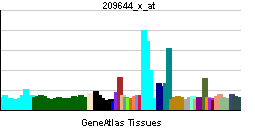

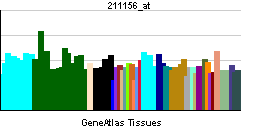
RNA expression pattern
Bgee	Human / Mouse (ortholog); Top expressed in: parotid gland; pituitary gland; testicle; anterior pituitary; subthalamic nucleus; tongue; ventral tegmental area; mucosa of pharynx; superior surface of tongue; external globus pallidus / Top expressed in: yolk sac; stroma of bone marrow; morula; embryo; glossopharyngeal ganglion; endothelial cell of lymphatic vessel; lumbar subsegment of spinal cord; calvaria; greater petrosal nerve; muscle of thigh; More reference expression data
BioGPS	More reference expression data
Gene ontology
Molecular function	NF-kappaB binding; protein binding; cyclin-dependent protein serine/threonine kinase inhibitor activity; protein kinase binding; RNA binding; DNA binding; p53 binding; transcription factor binding; MDM2/MDM4 family protein binding; ubiquitin-protein transferase inhibitor activity; SUMO transferase activity; disordered domain specific binding; ubiquitin ligase inhibitor activity
Cellular component	cytoplasm; cytosol; senescence-associated heterochromatin focus; nucleus; nuclear body; nucleoplasm; nucleolus; mitochondrion; protein-containing complex
Biological process	positive regulation of smooth muscle cell apoptotic process; negative regulation of cyclin-dependent protein serine/threonine kinase activity; replicative senescence; G1 phase; negative regulation of cell-matrix adhesion; cellular senescence; negative regulation of cell growth; positive regulation of cellular senescence; positive regulation of macrophage apoptotic process; cell cycle; Ras protein signal transduction; negative regulation of phosphorylation; negative regulation of transcription, DNA-templated; negative regulation of NF-kappaB transcription factor activity; negative regulation of cell population proliferation; G1/S transition of mitotic cell cycle; negative regulation of G1/S transition of mitotic cell cycle; apoptotic process; regulation of G2/M transition of mitotic cell cycle; regulation of transcription, DNA-templated; regulation of protein stability; negative regulation of immature T cell proliferation in thymus; regulation of protein export from nucleus; negative regulation of protein kinase activity; negative regulation of proteolysis involved in cellular protein catabolic process; protein K63-linked ubiquitination; positive regulation of signal transduction by p53 class mediator; somatic stem cell division; protein stabilization; protein polyubiquitination; positive regulation of protein sumoylation; transcription, DNA-templated; positive regulation of transcription, DNA-templated; autophagy of mitochondrion; apoptotic mitochondrial changes; regulation of protein targeting to mitochondrion; protein destabilization; negative regulation of ubiquitin-protein transferase activity; positive regulation of apoptotic process; rRNA processing; negative regulation of ubiquitin-dependent protein catabolic process; mitochondrial depolarization; positive regulation of DNA damage response, signal transduction by p53 class mediator; negative regulation of B cell proliferation; activation of cysteine-type endopeptidase activity involved in apoptotic process; regulation of apoptotic DNA fragmentation; positive regulation of transcription by RNA polymerase II; positive regulation of protein localization to nucleus; protein sumoylation; positive regulation of gene expression; negative regulation of ubiquitin protein ligase activity; amyloid fibril formation; negative regulation of protein neddylation
Sources:Amigo / QuickGO
Orthologs
Databases	NCBI: entry; OMA: entry
Species	Human	Mouse
Entrez	1029	12578
Ensembl	ENSG00000147889	ENSMUSG00000044303
UniProt	P42771; Q8N726	P51480; Q64364
RefSeq (mRNA)	NM_000077; NM_001195132; NM_058195; NM_058196; NM_058197 NM_001363763	NM_001040654; NM_009877
RefSeq (protein)	NP_000068; NP_001182061; NP_478102; NP_478104; NP_001350692 NP_478102.2	NP_001035744; NP_034007; NP_034007.1
Location (UCSC)	Chr 9: 21.97 – 22 Mb	Chr 4: 89.19 – 89.21 Mb
PubMed search
- Wikidata
View/Edit Human	View/Edit Mouse

Cyclin-dependent kinase inhibitor 2a p19Arf N-terminus
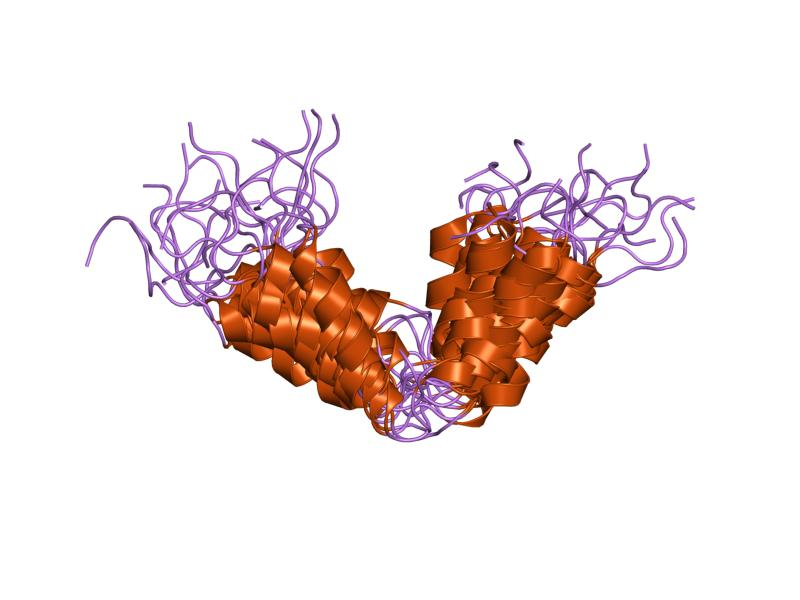
- Solution structure of the n-terminal 37 amino acids of the mouse arf tumor suppressor protein

Identifiers
- Symbol: P19Arf_N
- Pfam: PF07392
- InterPro: IPR010868
- SCOP2: 1hn3 / SCOPe / SUPFAM
Available protein structures:
- PDB: IPR010868 PF07392 (ECOD; PDBsum)
- AlphaFold: IPR010868; PF07392

p16 (also known as p16^{INK4a}, cyclin-dependent kinase inhibitor 2A, CDKN2A, multiple tumor suppressor 1 and numerous other synonyms), is a protein that slows cell division by slowing the progression of the cell cycle from the G1 phase to the S phase, thereby acting as a tumor suppressor. It is encoded by the CDKN2A gene. A deletion (the omission of a part of the DNA sequence during replication) in this gene can result in insufficient or non-functional p16, accelerating the cell cycle and resulting in several different types of cancer.

p16 can be used as a biomarker to improve the histological diagnostic accuracy of grade 3 cervical intraepithelial neoplasia (CIN). p16 is also implicated in the prevention of melanoma, oropharyngeal squamous cell carcinoma, cervical cancer, vulvar cancer and esophageal cancer.

p16 was discovered in 1993. It is a protein with 148 amino acids and a molecular weight of 16 kDa that comprises four ankyrin repeats. The name of p16 is derived from its molecular weight, and the alternative name p16^{INK4a} refers to its role in inhibiting cyclin-dependent kinase CDK4.

== Nomenclature ==
p16 is also known as:

- p16^{INK4A}
- p16^{Ink4}
- Cyclin-dependent kinase inhibitor 2A (CDKN2A)
- CDKN2
- CDK 4 Inhibitor
- Multiple Tumor Suppressor 1 (MTS1)
- TP16
- ARF
- MLM
- P14

== Gene ==
In humans, p16 is encoded by the CDKN2A gene, located on chromosome 9 (9p21.3). This gene generates several transcript variants that differ in their first exons. At least three alternatively spliced variants encoding distinct proteins have been reported, two of which encode structurally related isoforms known to function as inhibitors of CDK4. The remaining transcript includes an alternate exon 1 located 20 kb upstream of the remainder of the gene; this transcript contains an alternate open reading frame (ARF) that specifies a protein that is structurally unrelated to the products of the other variants. The ARF product functions as a stabilizer of the tumor suppressor protein p53, as it can interact with and sequester MDM2, a protein responsible for the degradation of p53. In spite of their structural and functional differences, the CDK inhibitor isoforms and the ARF product encoded by this gene, through the regulatory roles of CDK4 and p53 in cell cycle G1 progression, share a common functionality in controlling the G1 phase of the cell cycle. This gene is frequently mutated or deleted in a wide variety of tumors and is known to be an important tumor suppressor gene.

When organisms age, the expression of p16 increases to reduce the proliferation of stem cells. This reduction in the division and production of stem cells protects against cancer while increasing the risks associated with cellular senescence.

== Function ==
p16 is an inhibitor of cyclin-dependent kinases (CDK). It slows down the cell cycle by prohibiting progression from G1 phase to S phase. Otherwise, CDK4/6 binds cyclin D and forms an active protein complex that phosphorylates retinoblastoma protein (pRB). Once phosphorylated, pRB dissociates from the transcription factor E2F1. This liberates E2F1 from its bound state in the cytoplasm and allows it to enter the nucleus. Once in the nucleus, E2F1 promotes the transcription of target genes that are essential for transition from G1 to S phase.

This pathway connects the processes of tumor oncogenesis and senescence, fixing them on opposite ends of a spectrum. On one end, p16 hypermethylation, mutation, or deletion leads to downregulation of the gene and can lead to cancer through the dysregulation of cell cycle progression. Conversely, activation of p16 through reactive oxygen species, DNA damage, or senescence leads to the buildup of p16 in tissues and is implicated in the aging of cells.

== Regulation ==
Regulation of p16 is complex and involves the interaction of several transcription factors, as well as several proteins involved in epigenetic modification through methylation and repression of the promoter region.

PRC1 and PRC2 are two protein complexes that modify the expression of p16 through the interaction of various transcription factors that execute methylation patterns that can repress transcription of p16. These pathways are activated in the cellular response to reduce senescence.

== Clinical significance ==
=== Role in carcinogenesis ===
Mutations resulting in deletion or reduction of function of the CDKN2A gene are associated with increased risk of a wide range of cancers, and alterations of the gene are frequently seen in cancer cell lines. Examples include:

Pancreatic adenocarcinoma is often associated with mutations in the CDKN2A gene.

Carriers of germline mutations in CDKN2A have, besides their high risks of melanoma, also increased risks of pancreatic, lung, laryngeal and oropharyngeal cancers. Tobacco smoking increases the carriers' susceptibility for such non-melanoma cancers.

Homozygous deletions of p16 are frequently found in esophageal cancer and gastric cancer cell lines.

Germline mutations in CDKN2A are associated with an increased susceptibility to develop skin cancer.

Hypermethylation of tumor suppressor genes has been implicated in various cancers. In 2013, a meta-analysis revealed an increased frequency of DNA methylation of the p16 gene in esophageal cancer. As the degree of tumor differentiation increased, so did the frequency of p16 DNA methylation.

Tissue samples of primary oral squamous cell carcinoma (OSCC) often display hypermethylation in the promoter regions of p16. Cancer cells show a significant increase in the accumulation of methylation in CpG islands in the promoter region of p16. This epigenetic change leads to loss of the tumor suppressor gene function through two possible mechanisms: first, methylation can physically inhibit the transcription of the gene, and second, methylation can lead to the recruitment of transcription factors that repress transcription. Both mechanisms cause the same end result: downregulation of gene expression that leads to decreased levels of the p16 protein. It has been suggested that this process is responsible for the development of various forms of cancer serving as an alternative process to gene deletion or mutation.

p16 positivity has been shown to be favorably prognostic in oropharyngeal squamous cell carcinoma. In a retrospective trial analysis of patients with Stage III and IV oropharyngeal cancer, HPV status was assessed and it was found that the 3-year rates of overall survival were 82.4% (95% CI, 77.2 to 87.6) in the HPV-positive subgroup and 57.1% (95% CI, 48.1 to 66.1) in the HPV-negative subgroup, and the 3-year rates of progression-free survival were 73.7% (95% CI, 67.7 to 79.8) and 43.4% (95% CI, 34.4 to 52.4), respectively. p16 status is so prognostic that the AJCC staging system has been revised to include p16 status in oropharyngeal squamous cell cancer group staging. However, some people can have elevated levels of p16 but test negative for HPV and vice versa. This is known as discordant cancer. The 5-year survival for people who test positive for HPV and p16 is 81%, for discordant cancer it is 53–55%, and 40% for those who test negative for p16 and HPV.

== Clinical use ==
=== Biomarker for cancer types ===
Expression of p16 is used as a prognostic biomarker for certain types of cancer. The reason for this is different types of cancer can have different effects on p16 expression: cancers that overexpress p16 are usually caused by the human papillomavirus (HPV), whereas cancers in which p16 is downregulated will usually have other causes. For patients with oropharyngeal squamous cell carcinoma, using immunohistochemistry to detect the presence of the p16 biomarker has been shown to be the strongest indicator of disease course. Presence of the biomarker is associated with a more favorable prognosis as measured by cancer-specific survival (CSS), recurrence-free survival (RFS), locoregional control (LRC), as well as other measurements. The appearance of hypermethylation of p16 is also being evaluated as a potential prognostic biomarker for prostate cancer.

=== p16 FISH ===
p16 deletion detected by FISH in surface epithelial mesothelial proliferations is predictive of underlying invasive mesothelioma.

=== p16 immunochemistry ===
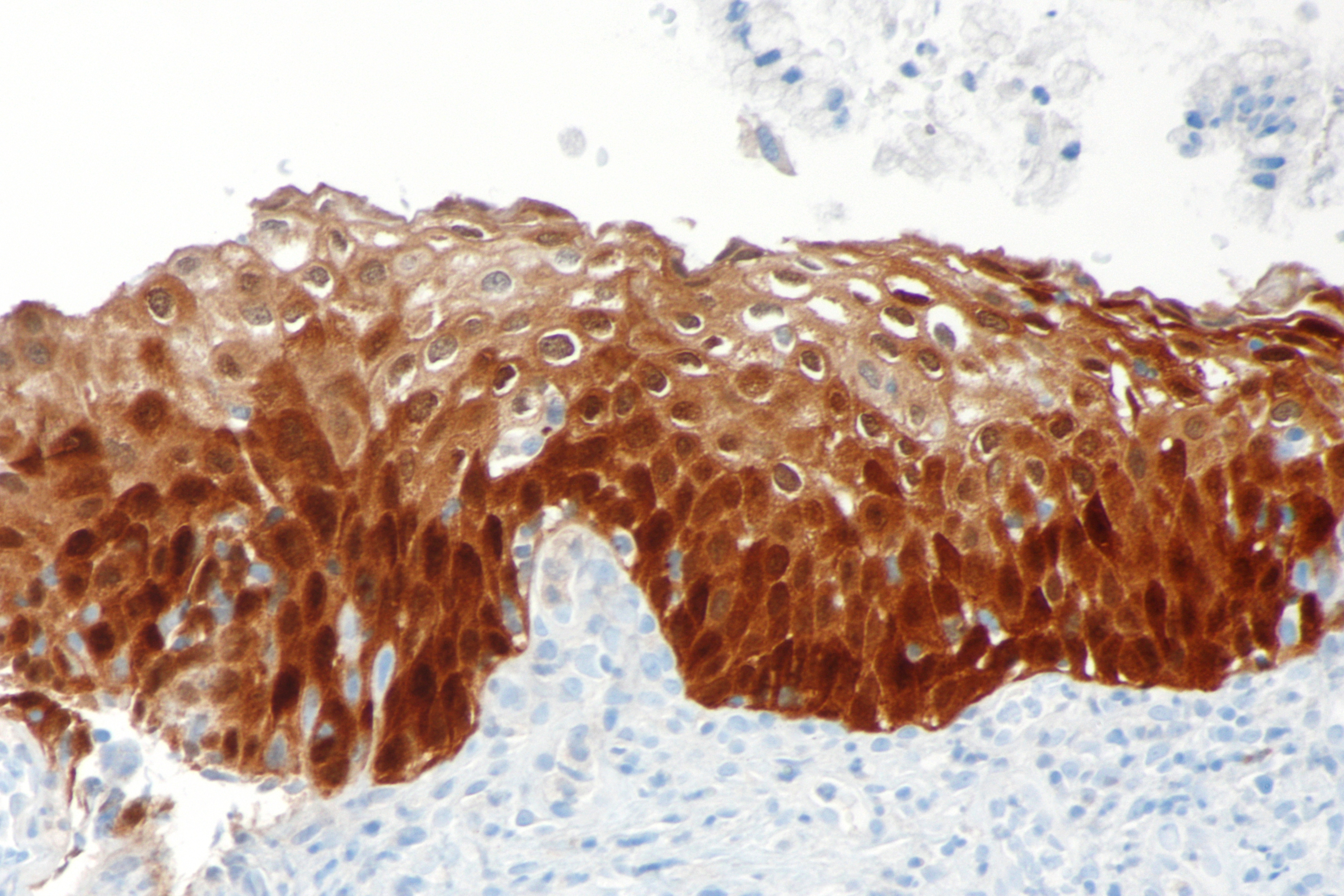
High grade squamous intraepithelial lesion showing strong p16 staining

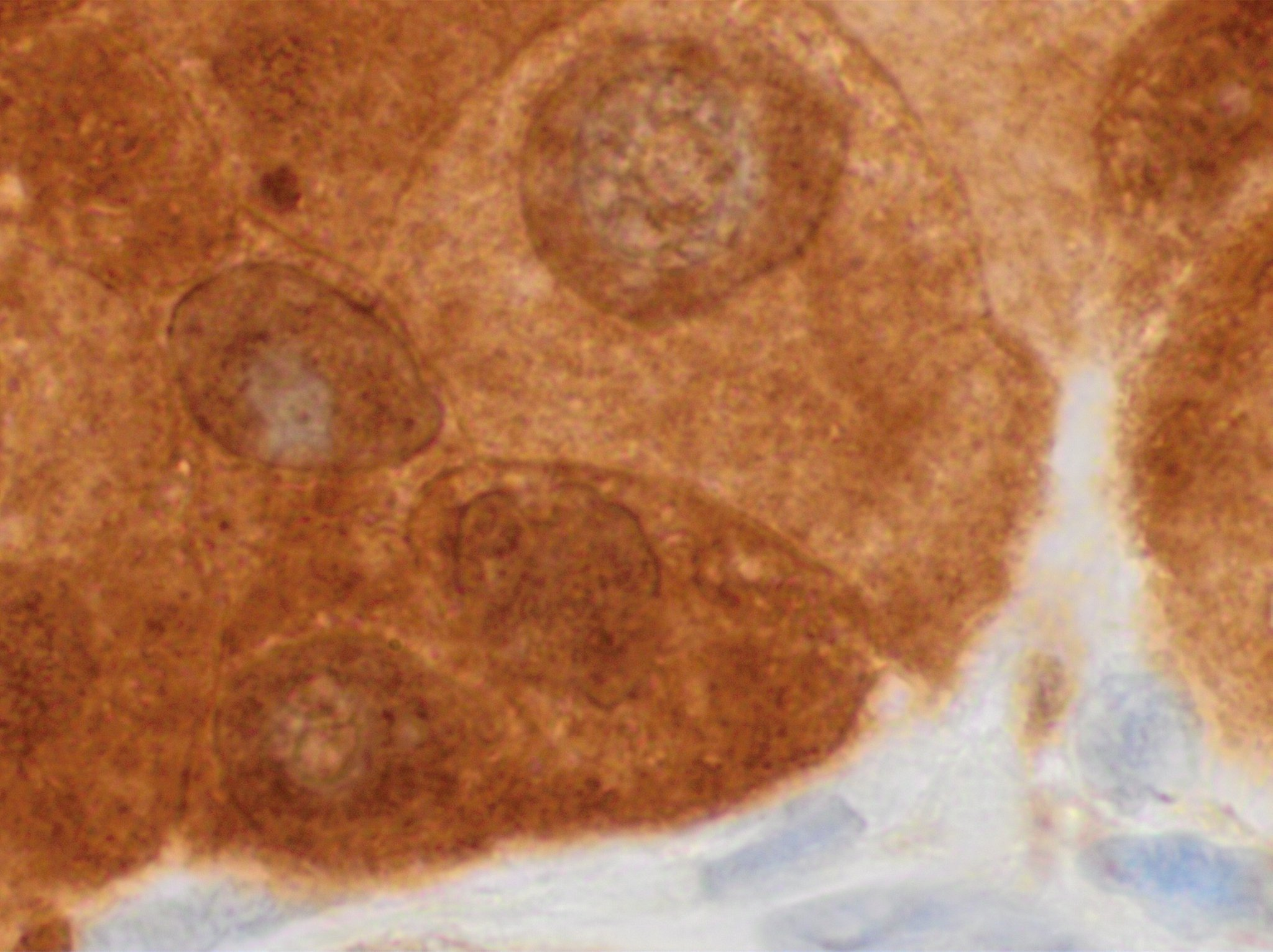
To count as positive, p16 immunohistochemistry should show "block" staining, which is strong nuclear and cytoplasmic expression in a continuous segment of cells.

As consensus grows regarding the strength of p16 as a biomarker for detecting and determining prognoses of cancer, p16 immunohistochemistry is growing in importance.

==== Gynecologic cancers ====
p16 is a widely used immunohistochemical marker in gynecologic pathology. Strong and diffuse cytoplasmic and nuclear expression of p16 in squamous cell carcinomas (SCC) of the female genital tract is strongly associated with high-risk human papilloma virus (HPV) infection and neoplasms of cervical origin. The majority of SCCs of uterine cervix express p16. However, p16 can be expressed in other neoplasms and in several normal human tissues.

=== Urinary bladder SCCs ===
More than a third of urinary bladder SCCs express p16. SCCs of urinary bladder express p16 independent of gender. p16 immunohistochemical expression alone cannot be used to discriminate between SCCs arising from uterine cervix versus urinary bladder.

=== Role in cellular senescence ===
Concentrations of p16INK4a increase dramatically as tissue ages. p16INK4a, along with senescence-associated beta-galactosidase, is regarded to be a biomarker of cellular senescence. Therefore, p16INK4a could potentially be used as a blood test that measures how fast the body's tissues are aging at a molecular level. Notably, a recent survey of cellular senescence induced by multiple treatments to several cell lines does not identify p16 as belonging to a "core signature" of senescence markers.

It has been used as a target to delay some aging changes in mice.

=== Role in neurogenesis ===
Increasing p16INK4a expression during aging is associated with reduced progenitor functions from the subventricular zone, which generates throughout life new neurons migrating to the olfactory bulb, thereby reducing olfactory neurogenesis. Deletion of p16INK4a does not affect neurogenesis in the other adult neurogenic niche, the dentate gyrus of the hippocampus. However, recently, it has been demonstrated that p16INK4a protects from depletion after a powerful proneurogenic stimulus—i.e., running— also stem and progenitor cells of the aged dentate gyrus. In fact, after deletion of p16INK4a, stem cells of the dentate gyrus are greatly activated by running, while, in wild-type p16INK4a dentate gyrus stem cells are not affected by running. Therefore, p16Ink4a plays a role in the maintenance of dentate gyrus stem cells after stimulus, by keeping a reserve of their self-renewal capacity during aging. Since the dentate gyrus plays a key role in spatial and contextual memory formation, p16INK4a is implicated in the maintenance of cognitive functions during aging.

== Discovery ==
Researchers Manuel Serrano, Gregory J. Hannon and David Beach discovered p16 in 1993 and correctly characterized the protein as a cyclin-dependent kinase inhibitor.

== Role in carcinogenesis ==
Since its discovery, p16 has become significant in the field of cancer research. The protein was suspected to be involved in carcinogenesis due to the observation that mutation or deletion in the gene was implicated in human cancer cell lines. The detection of p16 inactivation in familial melanoma supplied further evidence. p16 deletion, mutation, hypermethylation, or overexpression is now associated with various cancers. Whether mutations in p16 can be considered to be driver mutations requires further investigation.

== Interactions ==
p16 has been shown to interact with:

- CCNG1,
- CDK4,
- CDK6,
- DAXX,
- E4F1,
- MDM2,
- P53,
- PPP1R9B,
- RPL11, and
- SERTAD1.

== See also ==
- p21
- p53
- Cyclin-dependent kinase
- Cyclin D
