= Cellular senescence =

Phenomenon characterized by the cessation of cell division

The Hayflick limit suggests that the average cell will divide around 50 times before reaching a stage known as senescence. As the cell divides, the telomeres on the ends of a linear chromosome get shorter. The telomeres will eventually no longer be present on the chromosome. This end stage is the concept that links the deterioration of telomeres to aging.

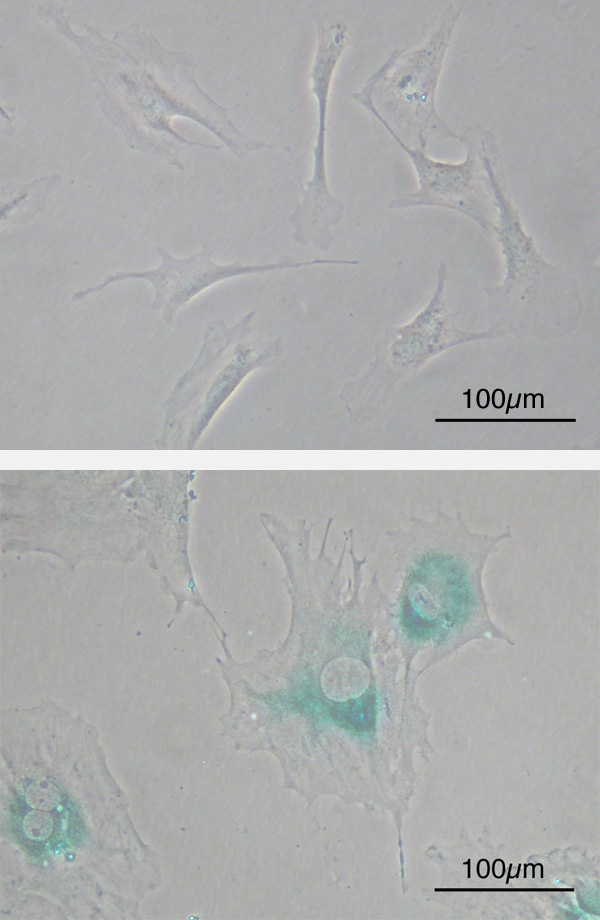
Top: Primary mouse embryonic fibroblast cells (MEFs) before senescence. Spindle-shaped. Bottom: MEFs became senescent after passages. Cells grow larger, flatten in shape, and express senescence-associated β-galactosidase (SABG, blue areas), a marker of cellular senescence.

Cellular senescence is a phenomenon characterized by the cessation of cell division. In their experiments during the early 1960s, Leonard Hayflick and Paul Moorhead found that normal human fetal fibroblasts in culture reach a maximum of approximately 50 cell population doublings before becoming senescent. This process called the Hayflick limit is also known as "replicative senescence", since it is brought about through replication. Hayflick's discovery of mortal cells paved the path for the discovery and understanding of cellular aging molecular pathways. Cellular senescence can be initiated by a wide variety of stress-inducing factors. These stress factors include both environmental and internal damaging events, abnormal cellular growth, oxidative stress, autophagy factors, among many other things.

The physiological importance of cell senescence has been attributed to prevention of carcinogenesis, and more recently, aging, development, and tissue repair. Senescent cells contribute to the aging phenotype, including frailty syndrome, sarcopenia, and aging-associated diseases. Senescent astrocytes and microglia contribute to neurodegeneration.

== Cellular mechanisms ==
=== Stress response and DNA damage ===
Mechanistically, replicative senescence can be triggered by a DNA damage response due to the shortening of telomeres. Cells can also be induced to senesce by DNA damage in response to elevated reactive oxygen species (ROS), activation of oncogenes, and cell-cell fusion. Normally, cell senescence is reached through a combination of a variety of factors (i.e., both telomere shortening and oxidative stress). The DNA damage response (DDR) arrests cell cycle progression until DNA damage, such as double-strand breaks (DSBs), is repaired. Senescent cells display persistent DDR that appears to be resistant to endogenous DNA repair activities. The prolonged DDR activates both ATM and ATR DNA damage kinases. The phosphorylation cascade initiated by these two kinases causes the eventual arrest of the cell cycle. Depending on the severity of the DNA damage, the cells may no longer be able to undergo repair and either go through apoptosis or cell senescence. Such senescent cells in mammalian culture and tissues retain DSBs and DDR markers. It has been proposed that retained DSBs are major drivers of the aging process. Mutations in genes relating to genome maintenance have been linked with premature aging diseases, supporting the role of cell senescence in aging.

Depletion of NAD+ can lead to DNA damage and cellular senescence in vascular smooth muscle cells.

Although senescent cells can no longer replicate, they remain metabolically active and commonly adopt an immunogenic phenotype that enables them to be eliminated by the immune system. The phenotype consists of a pro-inflammatory secretome, the up-regulation of immune ligands, a pro-survival response, promiscuous gene expression (pGE), and stain positive for senescence-associated β-galactosidase activity. Two proteins, senescence-associated beta-galactosidase and p16^{Ink4A}, are regarded as biomarkers of cellular senescence. However, this results in a false positive for cells that naturally have these two proteins, such as maturing tissue macrophages with senescence-associated beta-galactosidase and T-cells with p16^{Ink4A}.

The nucleus of senescent cells is characterized by senescence-associated heterochromatin foci (SAHF) and DNA segments with chromatin alterations reinforcing senescence (DNA-SCARS). Senescent cells affect tumour suppression, wound healing, and possibly embryonic/placental development, and a pathological role in age-related diseases.

=== Cell growth and size ===
Cell growth plays a crucial role in cell proliferation, regulating cellular homeostasis and cell cycle progression through dynamic changes in cell size. And like DNA damage, it can promote senescence by triggering a prolonged cell cycle arrest. While a typical increase in cell size controls for concentrations of cell cycle activators, an excess of growth can drive a permanent halt on cell proliferation as a result of various mechanistic interactions with cell-cycle signaling pathways and thresholds present.

As the cell increases in size without sufficient proliferation, cellular homeostasis becomes more and more difficult to achieve; the cell experiences cytoplasmic dilution and succumbs to a permanent cell cycle arrest. More particularly, the osmotic stress caused by this overgrowth is linked to an accumulation of p21 during G0/G1 arrest, consequently preventing re-entry into S phase. Additionally, the persistent growth of the cell during this arrest, as driven by mTOR signaling, causes phenotypes characteristic of senescent cells such as cellular hypertrophy, SASP and lysosomal hyperfunctions. The enlarged cells that are able to re-enter the cell cycle are prone to DNA damage and experience abnormalities in signaling for repair (NHEJ pathway), eventually leading to a replication failure and a permanent cell-cycle exit.

Overall, a consistent correlation between larger cell size and senescence has been established. Understanding this mechanistic relationship is useful for addressing different treatment sensitivities in clinical contexts. For tumors presenting growth signal mutations, cell cycle inhibitors (CDK4/6 and CDK7 inhibitors) hold potential to be a more useful therapeutic, given this cell-size dependency of cellular senescence.

=== Role of telomeres ===
Telomeres are DNA tandem repeats at the end of chromosomes that shorten during each cycle of cell division. Recently, the role of telomeres in cellular senescence has aroused general interest, especially with a view to the possible genetically adverse effects of cloning. The successive shortening of the chromosomal telomeres with each cell cycle is also believed to limit the number of divisions of the cell, contributing to aging. After sufficient shortening, proteins responsible for maintaining telomere structure, such as TRF2, are displaced, resulting in the telomere being recognized as a site of a double-strand break. This induces replicative senescence. Theoretically, it is possible, upon the discovery of the exact mechanism of biological immortality, to genetically engineer cells with the same capability. The length of the telomere strand has senescent effects; telomere shortening activates extensive alterations in alternative RNA splicing that produce senescent toxins such as progerin, which degrades tissue and makes it more prone to failure.

=== Role of oncogenes ===
BRAF^{V600E} and Ras are two oncogenes implicated in cellular senescence. BRAF^{V600E} induces senescence through synthesis and secretion of IGFBP7. Ras activates the MAPK cascade which results in increased p53 activation and p16^{INK4a} upregulation. The transition to a state of senescence due to oncogene mutations are irreversible and have been termed oncogene-induced senescence (OIS).

Interestingly, even after oncogenic activation of a tissue, several researchers have identified a senescent phenotype. Researchers have identified a senescent phenotype in benign lesions of the skin carrying oncogenic mutations in neurofibroma patients with a defect that specifically causes an increase in Ras. This finding has been highly reproducible in benign prostate lesions, in melanocytic lesions of UV-irradiated HGF/SF-transgenic mice, in lymphocytes and in the mammary gland from N-Ras transgenic mice, and in hyperplasias of the pituitary gland of mice with deregulated E2F activity. The key to these findings is that genetic manipulations that abrogated the senescence response led to full-blown malignancy in those carcinomas. As such, the evidence suggests senescent cells can be associated with pre-malignant stages of the tumor. Further, it has been speculated that a senescent phenotype might serve as a promising marker for staging. There are two types of senescence in vitro. The irreversible senescence, which is mediated by INK4a/Rb and p53 pathways, and the reversible senescent phenotype, which is mediated by p53. This suggests that the p53 pathway could be effectively harnessed as a therapeutic intervention to trigger senescence and ultimately mitigate tumorigenesis.

p53 has been shown to have promising therapeutic relevance in an oncological context. In the 2007 Nature paper by Xue et al., RNAi was used to regulate endogenous p53 in a liver carcinoma model. Xue et al. utilized a chimaeric liver cancer mouse model and transduced this model with the ras oncogene. They took embryonic progenitor cells, transduced those cells with oncogenic ras, along with the tetracycline transactivator (tta) protein to control p53 expression using doxycycline, a tetracycline analog, and tetracycline-responsive short hairpin RNA (shRNA). In the absence of Dox, p53 was actively suppressed as the microRNA levels increased, so as Dox was administered, p53 microRNA was turned off to facilitate the expression of p53. The liver cancers that expressed Ras showed signs of senescence following p53 reactivation, including an increase in senescence-associated β-galactosidase protein. Even if the expression of p53 was transiently activated or deactivated, senescence via SA β-gal was observed. Xue et al. show that by briefly reactivating p53 in tumors without functional p53 activity, tumor regression is observed. The induction of cellular senescence was associated with an increase in inflammatory cytokines, as is expected based on the SASP. The presence of both senescence and an increase in immune activity can regress and limit liver carcinoma growth in this mouse model.

== Signaling pathways ==
There are several reported signaling pathways that lead to cellular senescence, including the p53 and p16^{Ink4a} pathways. Both of these pathways are activated in response to cellular stressors and lead to cell cycle inhibition. p53 activates p21 which deactivates cyclin-dependent kinase 2(Cdk 2). Without Cdk 2, retinoblastoma protein (pRB) remains in its active, hypophosphorylated form and binds to the transcription factor E2F1, an important cell cycle regulator. This represses the transcriptional targets of E2F1, leading to cell cycle arrest after the G1 phase.

p16^{Ink4a} also activates pRB, but through inactivation of cyclin-dependent kinase 4 (Cdk 4) and cyclin-dependent kinase 6 (Cdk 6). p16^{Ink4a} is responsible for the induction of premature, stress-induced senescence. This is not irreversible; silencing of p16^{Ink4a} through promotor methylation or deletion of the p16^{Ink4a} locus allows the cell to resume the cell cycle if senescence was initiated by p16^{Ink4a} activation.

Senescence-associated secretory phenotype (SASP) gene expression is induced by several transcription factors, including C/EBPβ, of which the most important is NF-κB. Aberrant oncogenes, DNA damage, and oxidative stress induce mitogen-activated protein kinases, which are the upstream regulators of NF-κB.

Inhibition of the mechanistic target of rapamycin (mTOR) suppresses cellular senescence, hence cellular senescence is inhibited by rapamycin. Recent studies have also explored metabolic and epigenetic regulation of senescence. A 2025 iScience study reported that modulation of the α-ketoglutarate (AKG)–TET axis in cultured human cells influenced senescence-associated phenotypes, including oxidative stress, inflammatory signaling, and proliferative capacity.

== Characteristics of senescent cells ==
Senescent cells are highly heterogeneous, which has caused most authorities in the field to believe that a universal marker of senescent cells will not be found, and that a multi-marker approach is required for the detection of senescent cells. For this reason, the Cellular Senescence Program Network was created to identify and characterize senescent cells in different body tissues.

Senescent cells are especially common in skin and adipose tissue. Senescent cells are usually larger than non-senescent cells. Transformation of a dividing cell into a non-dividing senescent cell is a slow process that can take up to six weeks.

Senescent cells affect tumor suppression, wound healing, and possibly embryonic/placental development, and play a pathological role in age-related diseases. There are two primary tumor suppressor pathways known to mediate senescence: p14arf/p53 and INK4A/RB. More specifically p16INK4a-pRb tumor suppressor and p53 are known effectors of senescence. Most cancer cells have a mutated p53 and p16INK4a-pRb, which allows the cancer cells to escape a senescent fate. The p16 protein is a cyclin-dependent kinase (CDK) inhibitor, and it activates the Rb tumor suppressor. p16 binds to CDK 4/6 to inhibit the kinase activity and inhibit Rb tumor suppressor via phosphorylation. The Rb tumor suppressor has been shown to associate with E2F1 (a protein necessary for transcription) in its monophosphorylated form, which inhibits transcription of downstream target genes involved in the G1/S transition. As part of a feedback loop, increased phosphorylation of Rb increases p16 expression that inhibits Cdk4/6. Reduced Cdk4/6 kinase activity results in higher levels of the hypo-phosphorylated (monophosphorylated) form of Rb, which subsequently leads to reduced levels of p16 expression.

The removal of aggregated p16 INK 4A-positive senescent cells can delay tissue dysfunction and ultimately extend life. In the 2011 Nature paper by Baker et al. a novel transgene, INK-ATTAC, was used to inducibly eliminate p16 INK4A-positive senescent cells by action of a small molecule-induced activation of caspase 8, resulting in apoptosis. A BubR1 H/H mouse model, known to experience the clinicopathological characteristics of aging-infertility, abnormal curvature of the spine, sarcopenia, cataracts, fat loss, dermal thinning, arrhythmias, etc., was used to test the consequences of p16INK4a removal. In these mice, p16 INK4a aggregates in aging tissues, including skeletal and eye muscle, and adipose tissues. Baker et al. found that if the senescent cells are removed, it is possible to delay age-associated disorders. Not only does p16 play an important role in aging, but it also in auto-immune diseases like rheumatoid arthritis that progressively lead to mobility impairment in advanced disease.

In the nervous system, senescence has been described in astrocytes and microglia, but is less understood in neurons. Because senescence arrests cell division, studies of senescence in the brain were focused mainly on glial cells, and fewer studies were focused on nondividing neurons. Analyzing single-nucleus RNA-Seq data from human brains suggested p19 as a marker for senescent neurons, which are strongly associated with neurons containing neurofibrillary tangles.

=== SASP ===
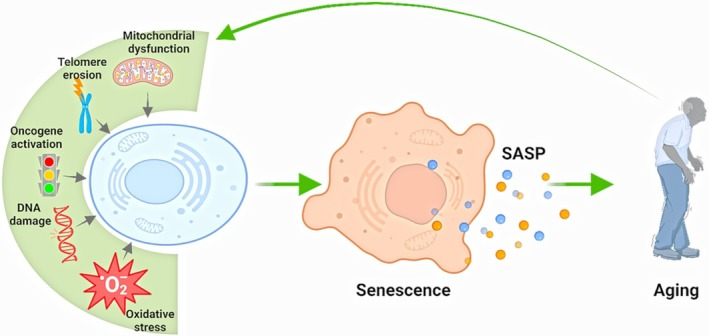
SASPs in glial cell senescence

The secretome of senescent cells is very complex. The products are mainly associated with inflammation, proliferation, and changes in the extracellular matrix. A Senescence Associated Secretory Phenotype (SASP) consisting of inflammatory cytokines, growth factors, and proteases is another characteristic feature of senescent cells. There are many SASP effector mechanisms that utilize autocrine or paracrine signalling. SASP induces an unfolded protein response in the endoplasmic reticulum because of an accumulation of unfolded proteins, resulting in proteotoxic impairment of cell function. Autophagy is upregulated to promote survival, while inflammaging is simultaneously induced.

Considering cytokines, SASP molecules IL-6 and IL-8 are likely to cause senescence without affecting healthy neighbor cells. IL-1beta, unlike IL-6 or IL-8, is able to induce senescence in normal cells with paracrine signaling. IL-1beta is also dependent on cleavage of IL-1 by caspase-1, causing a pro-inflammatory response. Growth factors, GM-CSF and VEGF also serve as SASP molecules. From the cellular perspective, cooperation of transcriptional factors NF-κB and C/EBPβ increase the level of SASP expression. Regulation of the SASP is managed through a transcription level autocrine feedback loop, but most importantly by a continuous DDR. Proteins p53, p21, p16ink4a, and Bmi-1 have been termed as major senescence signalling factors, allowing them to serve as markers. Other markers register morphology changes, reorganization of chromatin, apoptosis resistance, altered metabolism, enlarged cytoplasm or abnormal shape of the nucleus. SASPs have distinct effects depending on the cellular context, including inflammatory or anti-inflammatory and tumor or anti-tumor effects. While considered a pro-tumorogenic effect, they likely support already tumor-primed cells instead of shifting healthy cells into transformation. Likewise, they operate as anti-tumor protectors by facilitating the elimination of damaged cells by phagocytes. The SASP is associated with many age-related diseases, including type 2 diabetes and atherosclerosis. This has motivated researchers to develop senolytic drugs to kill and eliminate senescent cells to improve health in the elderly. The nucleus of senescent cells is characterized by senescence-associated heterochromatin foci (SAHF) and DNA segments with chromatin alterations reinforcing senescence (DNA-SCARS).

== Clearance of senescent cells by the immune system ==
Due to the heterogeneous nature of senescent cells, different immune system cells eliminate different senescent cells. Specific components of the senescence-associated secretory phenotype (SASP) factors secreted by senescent cells attract and activate different components of both the innate and adaptive immune system.

Natural killer cells (NK cells) and macrophages play a major role in the clearance of senescent cells. Natural killer cells directly kill senescent cells, and produce cytokines which activate macrophages which remove senescent cells. Senescent cells can be phagocytized by neutrophils as well as by macrophages. Senolytic drugs which induce apoptosis in senescent cells rely on phagocytic immune system cells to remove the apoptosed cells.

Natural killer cells can use NKG2D killer activation receptors to detect the MICA and ULBP2 ligands which become upregulated on senescent cells. The senescent cells are killed using perforin pore-forming cytolytic protein. CD8+ cytotoxic T-lymphocytes also use NKG2D receptors to detect senescent cells, and promote killing similar to NK cells.

Cytotoxic CD4+ T cells have also been implicated in the immune surveillance of senescent cells. In mice, senescent-cell-rich environments promote the differentiation of Eomesodermin+CCL5+ CD4 T cells, whereas selective loss of Eomes in CD4 T cells increases senescent-cell accumulation, accelerates physical decline, and reduces lifespan, suggesting a role for this population in limiting senescent-cell burden during aging.

Aging of the immune system (immunosenescence) results in a diminished capacity of the immune system to remove senescent cells, thereby leading to an increase in senescent cells. Chronic inflammation due to SASP from senescent cells can also reduce the capacity of the immune system to remove senescent cells. T cells, B cells, and NK cells have all been reported to become senescent themselves. Senescent-like aging CD8+ cytotoxic T-lymphocytes become more innate in structure and function, resembling NK cells. Immune system cells can be recruited by SASP to senescent cells, after which the SASP from the senescent cells can induce the immune system cells to become senescent.

Chimeric antigen receptor T cells have been proposed as an alternative means to senolytic drugs for the elimination of senescent cells. Urokinase receptors have been found to be highly expressed on senescent cells, leading researchers to use chimeric antigen receptor T cells to eliminate senescent cells in mice. Chimeric antigen receptor natural killer cells have been proposed as an allogeneic means of eliminating senescent cells.

== Transient senescence ==
It is important to recognize that cellular senescence is not inherently a negative phenomenon. During mammalian embryogenesis, programmed cellular senescence plays a role in tissue remodeling via macrophage infiltration and subsequent clearance of senescent cells. A study on the mesonephros and endolymphatic sac in mice highlighted the importance of cellular senescence for eventual morphogenesis of the embryonic kidney and the inner ear, respectively.

They serve to direct tissue repair and regeneration. Cellular senescence limits fibrosis during wound closure by inducing cell cycle arrest in myofibroblasts once they have fulfilled their function. When these cells have accomplished these tasks, the immune system clears them away. This phenomenon is termed acute senescence. Senescence of hepatic stellate cells could prevent progression of liver fibrosis, although this has not been implemented as a therapy, and would carry the risk of hepatic dysfunction.

The negative implications of cellular senescence present themselves in the transition from acute to chronic senescence. When the immune system cannot clear senescent cells at the rate at which senescent cells are being produced, possibly as a result of the decline in immune function with age, accumulation of these cells leads to a disruption in tissue homeostasis.

== Cellular senescence in mammalian disease ==
Transplantation of only a few (1 per 10,000) senescent cells into lean middle-aged mice was shown to be sufficient to induce frailty, early onset of aging-associated diseases, and premature death.

Biomarkers of cellular senescence have been shown to accumulate in tissues of older individuals. The accumulation of senescent cells in tissues of vertebrates with age is thought to contribute to the development of ageing-related diseases, including Alzheimer's disease, Amyotrophic lateral sclerosis, endocrine disorders including type 2 diabetes, and various cancers.

Progeria is another example of a disease that may be related to cell senescence. The disease is thought to be caused by mutations in the DNA damage response, telomere shortening, or a combination of the two. Progeroid syndromes are all examples of aging diseases where cell senescence appears to be implicated.

=== List of progeroid syndromes ===
- Hutchinson–Gilford progeria syndrome
- Rothmund–Thomson syndrome
- Werner syndrome
- Bloom syndrome
- Cockayne syndrome
- Xeroderma pigmentosum
- Trichothiodystrophy
- Xeroderma pigmentosum-Cockayne syndrome
- Restrictive dermopathy
- Mandibuloacral dysplasia
- Fanconi anaemia
- Seckel syndrome
- Ataxia telangiectasia
- Dyskeratosis congenita
- Hoyeraal–Hreidarsson syndrome
- Néstor-Guillermo progeria syndrome

== Senolytic drugs ==
Targeting senescent cells is a promising strategy to overcome age-related disease, simultaneously alleviate multiple comorbidities, and mitigate the effects of frailty. Removing the senescent cells by inducing apoptosis is the most straightforward option, and there are several agents that have been shown to accomplish this.

First-generation senolytics act by interfering with senescent cell anti-apoptotic pathways (SCAPs), the pro-survival programs that allow senescent cells to resist apoptosis. Navitoclax (ABT-263) inhibits the anti-apoptotic Bcl-2 family proteins BCL-2, BCL-xL and BCL-w. A second approach combines the tyrosine kinase inhibitor dasatinib with the flavonoid quercetin (D+Q).

As of 2026, senolytic drugs remain investigational. Navitoclax induced dose-dependent thrombocytopenia in oncological trials, because platelets depend on BCL-xL for survival. Clinical investigation of D+Q has consisted mainly of small early-phase studies.

Preclinical investigations, largly in mouse models, aim to decrease toxicity and address heterogeneity observed in responses to senolytic treatment: immune-mediated clearance of senescent cells (uPAR-targeted CAR T cells), exploitation of metabolic vulnerabilities of senescent cells (GLS1 inhibition), prodrug delivery for tissue-specific senolysis (SA-β-gal-activated prodrugs), and targeted protein degradation (BCL-2 family PROTACs that recruit E3 ligases poorly expressed in platelets).

== Organisms lacking senescence ==
Cellular senescence is not observed in some organisms, including perennial plants, sponges, corals, and lobsters. In other organisms, where cellular senescence is observed, cells eventually become post-mitotic: they can no longer replicate themselves through the process of cellular mitosis (i.e., cells experience replicative senescence). How and why cells become post-mitotic in some species has been the subject of much research and speculation, but it has been suggested that cellular senescence evolved as a way to prevent the onset and spread of cancer. Somatic cells that have divided many times will have accumulated DNA mutations and would be more susceptible to becoming cancerous if cell division continued. As such, it is becoming apparent that senescent cells undergo conversion to an immunologic phenotype that enables them to be eliminated by the immune system.

== See also ==
- Ageing
- Senolytic
- Apoptosis
- Mitotic catastrophe
- Necrosis
- Senescence
- DNA damage
- DNA repair
- Cell cycle
- Telomeres
- Progeroid syndromes
- Carcinogenesis
