= Genta (company) =

Biotechnology company

Coordinates: 40.6638°N 74.4148°W

Genta, Inc.
- Industry: Biotechnology
- Headquarters: Berkeley Heights, New Jersey
- Products: Genasense, Tesetaxel, Ganite,
- Website: www.genta.com

Genta Incorporated was a biopharmaceutical company started in La Jolla, California, which discovered and developed innovative drugs for the treatment of patients with cancer. Founded in 1989 by a highly skilled entrepreneur, the company focused on a novel technology known as antisense, which targets gene products that are associated with the onset and progression of serious diseases. At that time, only Ionis Pharmaceuticals, Inc. (Nasdaq: IONS) (formerly Isis Pharmaceuticals until December 2015) was conducting significant research with this technology. Antisense is a short span of oligonucleotides – modified DNA structures ranging from about 12-24 bases that selectively bind to specific RNA. The intent is to block expression of an aberrant protein that contributes to the disease of interest. Genta in-licensed three different antisense molecules that blocked Bcl-2, a fibroblast growth factor (FGF), and the gene c-myb, respectively.

== Overview ==
=== Products ===
==== Genasense (oblimersen sodium) ====
A potent Bcl-2 antisense molecule was discovered and patented by Dr. John Reed, one of the world's highly ranked scientists. Working with Dr. Carlo Croce, Reed was a key figure in understanding the central role of apoptosis in cancer cell death. Reed and others showed that cell-death in multiple types of cancer cells was blocked by expression of Bcl-2 protein. As a corollary, they showed that inhibitors of Bcl-2 function – or reduced expression of Bcl-2 protein – greatly enhanced cancer-killing activity when combined with conventional anticancer therapy.

Through the mid 1990s, drug development of oligonucleotides was slowed by the enormous cost of synthesizing custom DNA molecules. Moreover, animal studies showed the drug had to be injected in order to be effective, whereas oral administration led to rapid breakdown.

In 1995, Genta developed a clinical protocol for the first in-human study with a Bcl-2 inhibitor. While experts were highly enthusiastic about the approach, there was concern that very low drug supplies (due to very high cost) would constrain observations of clinical benefit. Nonetheless, based on pre-clinical work showing chemotherapy sensitization of melanoma cells, a small Phase 1 study restricted to 14 patients with advanced melanoma was initiated in 1997 that reported acceptable safety and evidence of clinical activity.

By then, a publicly traded company with financial constraints, external investors assumed control of Genta and initiated reductions in activity and expenses. The company was eventually able to restore market confidence and secured sufficient financing to expand clinical trials using “Genasense”, the new name for its Bcl-2 inhibitor.

In clinical trials, the underlying scientific premise was that blocking Bcl-2 expression would enhance the cancer-killing effects of standard anticancer therapy. As a corollary, however, this concept implied that convincing evidence of activity would require a direct comparison with standard treatment. Between 2001 and 2004, Genta initiated and completed three, global, randomized studies in melanoma, myeloma, and chronic lymphocytic leukemia. Given exceptionally poor patient outcomes in melanoma, a randomized double-blind trial was initiated using a standard drug (dacarbazine) with or without Genasense. The initial size of this trial was expanded to enable a direct comparison of safety and efficacy, which involved 139 research sites in 9 countries. Results showed statistically significant benefits (p < 0.05) in progression-free survival (PFS), overall response rate, and complete response rate. Overall survival also increased (9.0 vs.7.8 mos.; p = 0.077) but did not achieve statistical significance.

Genasense had already been granted “Fast Track” status by the U.S. Food and Drug Administration (FDA). External reviews by melanoma experts suggested these data could be sufficient for conditional regulatory approval by FDA, subject to conduct of a follow-on confirmatory study. External reviewers also noted: (1) no drug had ever shown a survival improvement in melanoma; (2) no drug had ever been required to show increased survival by any regulatory authority; (3) the melanoma drug most recently considered for approval by FDA in melanoma (temozolomide; Temodar; Schering Plough) had been reviewed on the basis of whether there was statistically significant improvement in progression-free survival, which had not been achieved.

Together, these considerations strongly suggested that the significant increase in PFS, together with increased response rates and the trend in overall survival, would be favorably considered. At a FDA Advisory Committee on May 3, 2004, the Genasense data were felt to be insufficient, and the drug was not approved. A follow-up study by Genta, which was intended to show a survival benefit in a subset of patients with advanced melanoma, was unsuccessful.

Genasense faced a similar regulatory outcome in the review of its randomized trial of standard chemotherapy with or without Genasense in patients with chronic lymphocytic leukemia (CLL). In this trial, the primary endpoint was response rate – a primary approval endpoint for other CLL drugs, but more rigorously defined in this study as limited to complete plus nodular partial response (CR/nPR). In a study of 241 patients, the CR/nPR rate was significantly increased to 17% in patients who received Genasense plus chemotherapy vs. 7% who received chemotherapy alone (p = 0.025). Patents who achieved CR/nPR on the Genasense arm also demonstrated statistically superior increases in both overall survival as well as progression-free survival compared with patients who achieved CR/nPR using chemotherapy alone. Despite achieving the primary endpoint, on September 6, 2006 at an FDA Advisory Committee meeting, the overall patient benefit was considered modest and insufficient for approval.

===== Follow-up of the Genasense Development Program =====
Throughout the period from 2004-2015, progression-free survival (PFS) was widely accepted as a primary approval endpoint for patients with solid tumors. Temozolomide (Temodar) had been approved in brain cancer, and the drug continued to be widely used off-label in patients with melanoma.

In 2016, a different Bcl-2 inhibitor (venetoclax: Venclexta) (Genentech/AbbVie) was approved by FDA after a single non-randomized trial of relapsed CLL patients with 17p deletion, and on the basis of overall response rate (i.e., all types, complete plus partial), with a safety profile similar to Genasense.

Genta halted the development of Genasense in 2008. The company also elected not to pursue clinical development of antisense drugs targeting FGF or c-myb. Genasense was the first systemic antisense drug to undergo global regulatory review. Since then, more than 10 different antisense drugs have been approved for patients with a wide range of serious clinical illnesses.

==== Tesetaxel ====
Tesetaxel is a novel taxane that is being developed as cancer therapy. Unlike standard taxanes (paclitaxel Taxol; docetaxel (Taxotere) that require slow intravenous administration and are mainstays of cancer treatment, tesetaxel is taken by mouth. The drug also appeared to cause fewer side-effects than IV taxanes. Preclinically, tesetaxel demonstrated substantially higher activity against cancer cell lines that were resistant to paclitaxel and docetaxel, since acquired resistance to this drug class is not mediated by the multidrug-resistant p-glycoprotein.

Discovered by Daiichi Sankyo Pharmaceutical Company, Tokyo, Japan, tesetaxel was tested by Daiichi in early Phase 1 and Phase 2 studies. However, the drug was placed on “clinical hold” by the U.S Food and Drug Administration due to deaths of several patients with severe blood count depression, and Daiichi's efforts to remove the regulatory hold were unsuccessful.

On May 7, 2008, Genta entered into a licensing agreement for global rights to tesetaxel with Daiichi Sankyo. Shortly thereafter, Genta secured FDA's agreement to remove the clinical hold with a brief submission that ensured patient safety.

Between 2008-2012, Genta conducted an array of Phase 1 and Phase 2 studies, and subsequently the company initiated two global Phase 3 trials of tesetaxel in combination with capecitabine in breast cancer and gastric cancer, respectively. With positive Phase 3 data, Genta projected potential FDA approval and commercial U.S. launch of tesetaxel for treatment of metastatic breast cancer in 2014. However, financial constraints forced termination of the Phase 3 programs in 2012.

Global rights to tesetaxel were acquired from the Genta estate in 2013. Clinical development of tesetaxel was resumed by Odanate Therapeutics (ODT; Nasdaq), which is conducting Phase 3 studies for its approval in breast cancer.

==== Gallium Products ====
With the emergence of platinum-based drugs as cancer treatment, the U.S. National Cancer Institute initiated a screening program for other metals as anticancer drugs in the 1970s. ^{67}Ga was already being used in radiology scans to image potential areas of inflammation and some types of cancer, and gallium nitrate emerged as a potentially effective anticancer agent. Early clinical studies unexpectedly showed that gallium nitrate markedly reduced serum calcium, which when elevated is a potentially life-threatening complication in cancer patients.

With this discovery, a team at Memorial Sloan-Kettering in New York initiated a clinical development program that showed the drug was highly effective. Follow-on Phase 3 randomized trials showed the drug was superior to other agents used at that time, including injectable calcitonin and intravenous etidronate. Concurrent studies also suggested clinical activity in patients with severe hypercalcemia due to parathyroid carcinoma as well as patients with bone diseases, including Paget's disease, multiple myeloma, and bone metastases. In 2003, the drug was approved as Ganite® (gallium nitrate solution) for the treatment of hypercalcemia resistant to hydration, and the drug was marketed by Fujisawa Inc.

Work at the Hospital for Special Surgery in New York and elsewhere suggested that gallium reduced bone resorption and might also stimulate bone formation. Collectively, this information suggested the drug might be useful for treatment of diseases associated with accelerated bone loss, included bone metastases, Paget's disease, and osteoporosis. Genta Inc. acquired global rights to the marketed drug in 2001, and filed an IND and NDA (both approved by FDA) in 2002 and 2003, respectively. However, the regulatory failure of Genasense in melanoma caused termination of the marketing program for Ganite. Nonetheless, research with gallium-containing compounds was pursued in women with breast cancer and metastatic bone disease.

To improve patient convenience, Genta developed and patented an oral formulation of gallium known as G4544, and the company filed an IND and conducted a preliminary clinical study of G544 that showed superior oral absorption.

Based on discovery work at the University of Washington, in 2010 Genta tested an infusion of Ganite in the first patient with cystic fibrosis, demonstrating safety and potential therapeutic concentrations of gallium for reducing Pseudomonas aeruginosa bacterial infections. Genta also supported the clinical follow-on study at the University of Washington with regulatory cross-reference of both the Ganite IND and drug supply.

Despite promising results, all work on therapeutic gallium compounds by Genta ceased in 2012 due to financial conditions. The cystic fibrosis work has continued to be supported by the Cystic Fibrosis Foundation. Gallium nitrate is currently being administered to patients via inhalation.

==== Other Products ====
The Genasense setbacks prompted termination of two other Genta projects, both in preclinical stages. Galaterone, a drug in-licensed from the University of Maryland, was a small molecule intended for treatment of prostate cancer. As a compound acting as both an androgen receptor antagonist and an inhibitor of CYP17, the drug appeared to have substantial promise. Upon Genta's termination of its license, Gelaterone was re-licensed to Tokai Pharmaceuticals, Inc. In order to expand its nucleotide franchise, Genta had purchased Salus Therapeutics and acquired a portfolio of small interfering ribonucleic acid technologies (siRNA), which also could not be developed due to financial constraints.

== Company Operations ==
With funding constraints and serial layoffs in the mid-to-late 1990s, Genta had been reduced to six employees. In 1997, the La Jolla facility was closed and the company was moved to Lexington, MA. A new CEO was recruited in late 1999 who opened a temporary office in New York. New Jersey was then a home for global pharmaceutical companies and experienced employees. Genta moved from Lexington, MA into temporary space in Short Hills, NJ, and then into permanent space in Berkeley Heights, NJ, where it remained for the next 12 years.

== Financial History ==
New management initiated a vigorous business development program to secure co-development funding for the costly Genasense programs. In April 2002, having initiated Phase 3 trials and solicited interest from a number of multinational companies, Genta signed a global development and licensing deal with Aventis Incorporated. At that time, the nominal $480 million deal was the second largest ever concluded for a single-product oncology compound (just behind Erbitux®; Imclone Systems to Bristol Myers Squibb). However, the Genta deal also included funding for U.S. clinical development expenses estimated at an additional $400 million, U.S. co-marketing rights with 50% coverage of Genta's marketing expenses, 100% coverage of all ex-U.S. clinical development expenses, escalating double-digit royalties on U.S. and global sales, and a $75 million investment via a convertible loan.

Despite disappointing survival results from the Phase 3 melanoma trial, both companies favored submission of a New Drug Application, which was not approved by FDA in 2004. Aventis and Genta terminated their agreement in May 2005 with provisions for continued funding of the Phase 3 CLL program. Over the 3-year duration, Aventis had contributed $270 million to Genta.

Following termination, fund-raising to support ongoing programs was considerably constrained, which prompted serial workforce reductions and cost-saving initiatives. Despite positive Phase 3 data, in 2006 the New Drug Application in CLL was not approved by FDA. Having previously secured FDA's Special Protocol Assessment requiring a post-approval confirmatory study, FDA's decision not to consider the initial study as supportive was appealed by Genta and it was reversed by FDA in 2009. FDA reaffirmed the requirement for a confirmatory trial, which Genta had not contested. However, the extended appeal and continued funding challenges precluded further study of Genta's Bcl-2 inhibitor in CLL.

By 2008, company funds were insufficient to proceed, and Genta issued a series of convertible notes to supportive investors, which provided credence to its subsequent development programs. Over the subsequent four years, however, Genta stock came under intensive pressure as it became a “penny stock” that required several “reverse stock splits”. The company stock was also temporarily delisted from the Nasdaq stock exchange.

By mid June 2012, the company believed it had secured additional financing to both remain on Nasdaq and to continue its Phase 3 studies with tesetaxel, which ultimately failed to close. Lacking financial alternatives, Genta filed for Chapter 7 bankruptcy in August 2012 and ceased operations.
