= POU2AF2 =

Protein-coding gene in humans

An Error has occurred retrieving Wikidata item for infobox

POU domain class 2-associating factor 2 is a protein that in humans is encoded by the POU2AF2 gene (previously C11orf53). Reduction in POU2AF2 gene expression is associated with increased odds of occurrence of colorectal cancer. Specifically sequence variation (rs3802842) close to the POU2AF2 gene locus that lowers the expression of POU2AF2 has been observed in the colonic mucosal cells immediately adjacent to colon cancer tumors. POU2AF2 downregulation aids in cells' ability to survive in acidic conditions, which are typical of the tumor microenvironment. CRISPR-Cas9 inactivation of POU2AF2 in an acute myeloid leukemia cell line made the cells resistant to the BCL2 inhibitor Venetoclax, further supporting a role in cancer predisposition.

Additional roles have been proposed.
