= Harry Carey =

Harry Carey may refer to:

- Harry Carey (actor) (1878–1947), American actor
- Harry Carey Jr. (1921–2012), American actor
- Harry Carey (footballer) (1916–1991), Australian rules footballer

== See also ==
- Henry Carey (disambiguation)
- Harry Caray (disambiguation)
- Harikari, English corruption of term Harakiri
