= BCL2-related protein A1 =

Protein-coding gene in the species Homo sapiens

BCL2A1
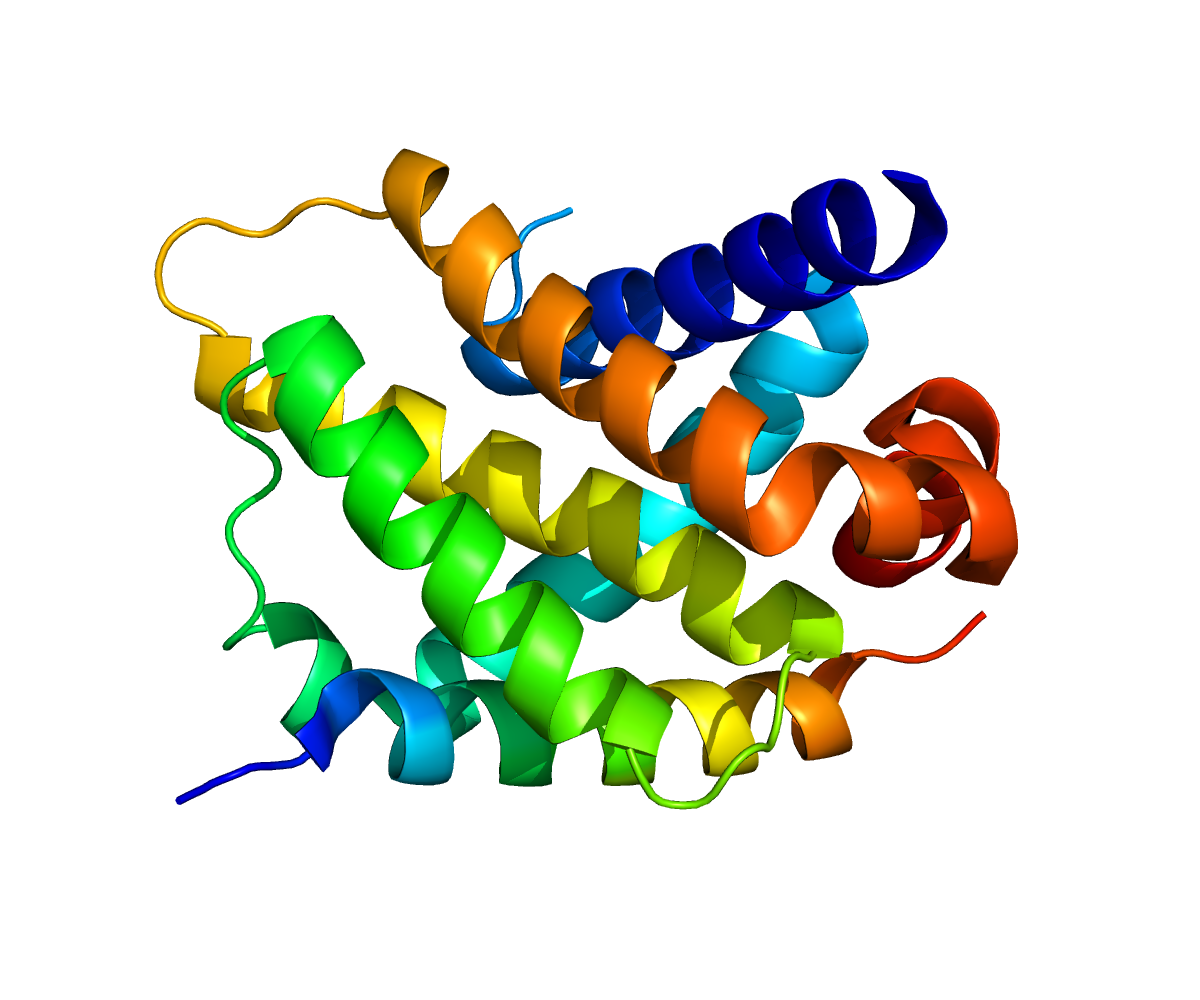

Identifiers
- Aliases: BCL2A1, ACC-1, ACC-2, ACC1, ACC2, BCL2L5, BFL1, GRS, HBPA1, BCL2 related protein A1
- External IDs: OMIM: 601056; MGI: 1278325; GeneCards: BCL2A1
Available structures
PDB	Ortholog search: PDBe RCSB
PDB	List of PDB id codes 2VM6, 3I1H, 3MQP, 4ZEQ

Gene location (Human)
Chr.	Chromosome 15 (human)
Band	15q25.1	Start	79,960,892 bp
Band	15q25.1	End	79,971,196 bp

Gene location (Mouse)
Chr.	Chromosome 9 (mouse)
Band	9|9 E3.1	Start	88,605,338 bp
Band	9|9 E3.1	End	88,613,967 bp
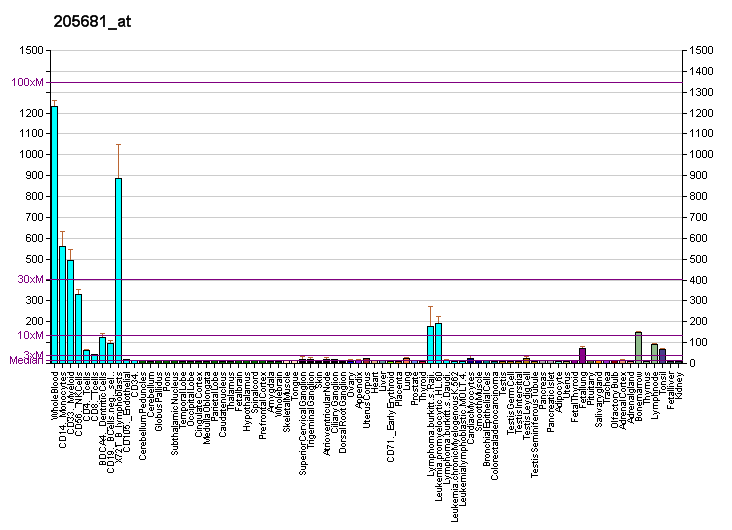
RNA expression pattern
Bgee	Human / Mouse (ortholog); Top expressed in: periodontal fiber; monocyte; granulocyte; bone marrow; right lung; bone marrow cell; spleen; appendix; upper lobe of left lung; testicle / Top expressed in: membranous bone; Dermatocranium; mandible; spleen; maxilla; thymus; right lung; left lung; blastocyst; ileum; More reference expression data
BioGPS	More reference expression data
Gene ontology
Molecular function	protein binding; channel activity; protein homodimerization activity; protein heterodimerization activity; BH domain binding
Cellular component	cytoplasm; mitochondrial outer membrane
Biological process	apoptotic process; regulation of apoptotic process; negative regulation of apoptotic process; release of cytochrome c from mitochondria; mitochondrial fusion; intrinsic apoptotic signaling pathway in response to DNA damage; positive regulation of apoptotic process; transmembrane transport; extrinsic apoptotic signaling pathway in absence of ligand; ageing; cerebral cortex development; negative regulation of intrinsic apoptotic signaling pathway
Sources:Amigo / QuickGO
Orthologs
Databases	NCBI: entry; OMA: entry
Species	Human	Mouse
Entrez	597	12047
Ensembl	ENSG00000140379	ENSMUSG00000099974
UniProt	Q16548	O55179
RefSeq (mRNA)	NM_004049; NM_001114735	NM_007536
RefSeq (protein)	NP_001108207; NP_004040	NP_031562
Location (UCSC)	Chr 15: 79.96 – 79.97 Mb	Chr 9: 88.61 – 88.61 Mb
PubMed search
- Wikidata
View/Edit Human	View/Edit Mouse

Bcl-2-related protein A1 is a protein in humans which is encoded by the BCL2A1 gene.

== Function ==
This gene encodes a member of the bcl2 protein family. The proteins of this family form hetero- or homodimers and act as anti- and pro-apoptotic regulators that are involved in a wide variety of cellular activities such as embryonic development, homeostasis, and tumorigenesis. The protein encoded by this gene can reduce the release of pro-apoptotic cytochrome c from mitochondria and block caspase activation. This gene is a direct transcription target of NF-kappa B in response to inflammatory mediators and is up-regulated by different extracellular signals, such as granulocyte-macrophage colony-stimulating factor (GM-CSF), CD40, phorbol ester, and inflammatory cytokine TNF and IL-1, which suggests a cytoprotective function that is essential for lymphocyte activation as well as cell survival.

In melanocytic cells BCL2A1 gene expression may be regulated by MITF.

== Interactions ==
BCL2-related protein A1 has been shown to interact with:

- Bcl-2-associated X protein, and
- Bcl-2-associated death promoter.
