= Sonrotoclax =

Chemical compound

Clinical data
- Pronunciation: /sɒnˈroʊtəklæks/ son-ROH-tə-klaks
- Trade names: Beqalzi
- AHFS/Drugs.com: Monograph
- MedlinePlus: a626069
- License data: US DailyMed: Sonrotoclax
- Routes of administration: By mouth
- Drug class: Antineoplastic
- ATC code: None

Legal status
- Legal status: US: ℞-only

Identifiers
- IUPAC name: N-[4-({[(1r,4r)-4-hydroxy-4-methylcyclohexyl]methyl}amino)-3-nitrobenzene-1-sulfonyl]-4-(2-{(2S)-2-[2-(propan-2-yl)phenyl]pyrrolidin-1-yl}-7-azaspiro[3.5]nonan-7-yl)-2-[(1H-pyrrolo[2,3-b]pyridin-5-yl)oxy]benzamide
- CAS Number: 2383086-06-2
- PubChem CID: 149553242
- DrugBank: DB18753
- ChemSpider: 129309008
- UNII: 30R67U9KYS
- KEGG: D12883
- ChEMBL: ChEMBL5314951

Chemical and physical data
- Formula: C_{49}H_{59}N_{7}O_{7}S
- Molar mass: 890.11 g·mol^{−1}
- 3D model (JSmol): Interactive image
- SMILES: CC(C)C1=CC=CC=C1[C@@H]2CCCN2C3CC4(C3)CCN(CC4)C5=CC(=C(C=C5)C(=O)NS(=O)(=O)C6=CC(=C(C=C6)NCC7CCC(CC7)(C)O)[N+](=O)[O-])OC8=CN=C9C(=C8)C=CN9
- InChI: InChI=1S/C49H59N7O7S/c1-32(2)39-7-4-5-8-40(39)43-9-6-22-55(43)36-28-49(29-36)19-23-54(24-20-49)35-10-12-41(45(26-35)63-37-25-34-16-21-50-46(34)52-31-37)47(57)53-64(61,62)38-11-13-42(44(27-38)56(59)60)51-30-33-14-17-48(3,58)18-15-33/h4-5,7-8,10-13,16,21,25-27,31-33,36,43,51,58H,6,9,14-15,17-20,22-24,28-30H2,1-3H3,(H,50,52)(H,53,57)/t33?,43-,48?/m0/s1; Key:ZQTKOYMWCCSKON-HCWAPQBJSA-N

Sonrotoclax, sold under the brand name Beqalzi, is an anti-cancer medication used for the treatment of mantle cell lymphoma. It is a BCL-2 inhibitor that can overcome resistance associated with BCL2 mutations, such as the G101V variant, which limits the effectiveness of first-generation inhibitors like venetoclax.

== Medical uses ==
Sonrotoclax is indicated for the treatment of adults with relapsed or refractory mantle cell lymphoma after at least two lines of systemic therapy, including a Bruton's tyrosine kinase inhibitor.

== Contraindications ==
Sonrotoclax is contraindicated with strong CYP3A inhibitors at initiation and ramp-up phase due to potential increased risk of Tumor lysis syndrome.

== Society and culture ==
=== Legal status ===
Sonrotoclax was approved for medical use in the United States in May 2026. Sonrotoclax is also approved in China for mantle cell lymphoma, along with CLL/SLL.

Sonrotoclax also has a fast track designation by the FDA for Waldenström macroglobulinemia. It additionally has an orphan drug designation by the FDA for Waldenström macroglobulinemia, multiple myeloma, acute myeloid leukemia, and myelodysplastic syndromes.

=== Names ===
Sonrotoclax is the international nonproprietary name.

Sonrotoclax is sold under the brand name Beqalzi.
