= Harakiri (disambiguation) =

Harakiri (or hara-kiri) most often refers to a form of seppuku (or ritual suicide), often miswritten as "harikari".

Harakiri may also refer to:

== Film and television ==
- Harakiri: Die Tragödie einer Geisha, a 1913 German film by Harry Piel
- Harakiri (1919 film), a German film by Fritz Lang
- The Battle (1934 film), also released as Hara-Kiri, a French film by Nicolas Farkas and Viktor Tourjansky
- Harakiri (1962 film), a Japanese film by Masaki Kobayashi
- "Hara-Kiri: Murder", a 1974 episode of the US television series Hawaii Five-O
- Harakiri (1975 film), a Turkish film by Ertem Göreç
- Harakiri (2000 film), a Dutch film by Jimmy Tai
- Hara-Kiri: Death of a Samurai, a 2011 Japanese film by Takashi Miike, the remake of the 1962 film

== Music ==
- Harakiri (album), an album by Serj Tankian, or the title song
- "Harakiri", a song from the 2007 album Turn the Lights Out by The Ponys
- "Hari Kari", a song from the 2009 album Ignore the Ignorant by The Cribs

== People ==
- Harry Caray (1914–1998), American sportscaster and Chicago Cubs announcer
- Harry Carey (actor) (1878–1947), American actor known for his work in silent films

== Places ==
- Harakiri Yagura, one of the yagura (tombs) where Hōjō Takatoki allegedly killed himself at the fall of the shogunate in 1333
- Harakiri (ski piste), the steepest ski slope of Austria

== Other uses ==
- Harakiri (video game), a 1990 PC game from Game Arts
- HRK (gene), pronounced "harakiri", a human gene
- Hara-Kiri (magazine), a French magazine
- Harakiri, a 1973 opera composed by Péter Eötvös
