= Bcl-2-associated death promoter =

Mammalian protein found in Homo sapiens

BAD

Identifiers
- Aliases: BAD, BBC2, BCL2L8, BCL2 associated agonist of cell death
- External IDs: OMIM: 603167; MGI: 1096330; GeneCards: BAD
Available structures
PDB	Ortholog search: PDBe RCSB
PDB	List of PDB id codes 1G5J

Gene location (Human)
Chr.	Chromosome 11 (human)
Band	11q13.1	Start	64,269,830 bp
Band	11q13.1	End	64,284,704 bp

Gene location (Mouse)
Chr.	Chromosome 19 (mouse)
Band	19|19 A	Start	6,919,229 bp
Band	19|19 A	End	6,929,267 bp
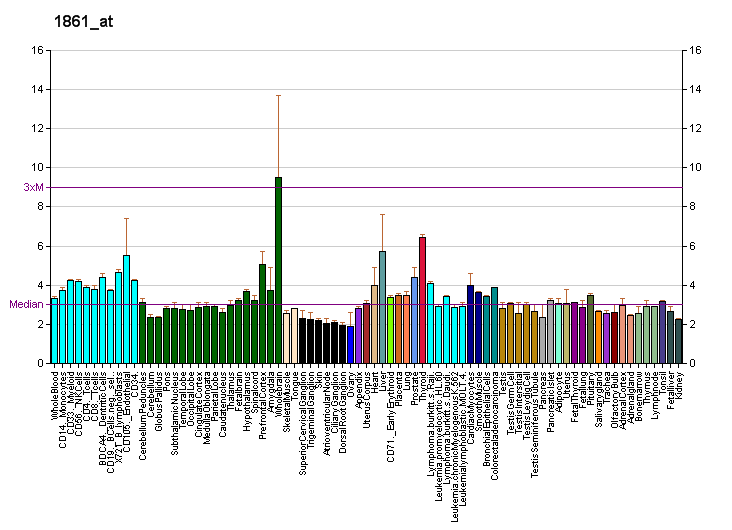

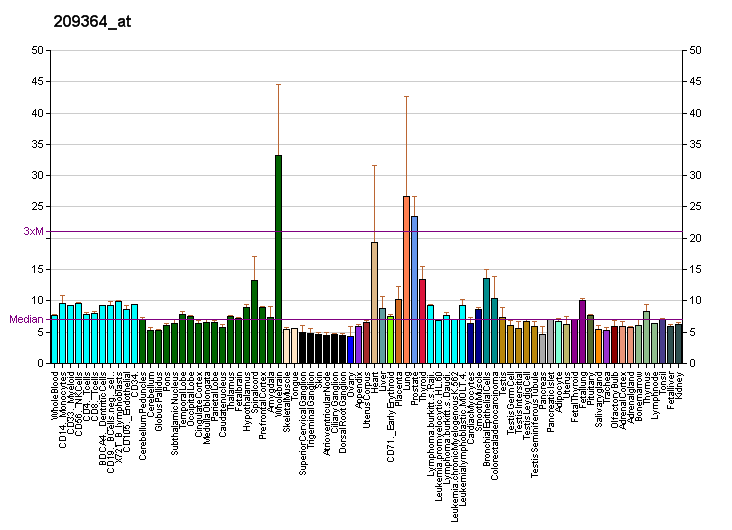
RNA expression pattern
Bgee	Human / Mouse (ortholog); Top expressed in: mucosa of transverse colon; right frontal lobe; right auricle of heart; apex of heart; body of stomach; C1 segment; olfactory zone of nasal mucosa; right coronary artery; muscle layer of sigmoid colon; left coronary artery / Top expressed in: blastocyst; internal carotid artery; external carotid artery; lip; facial motor nucleus; duodenum; right kidney; pyloric antrum; granulocyte; morula; More reference expression data
BioGPS	More reference expression data
Gene ontology
Molecular function	14-3-3 protein binding; protein phosphatase binding; protein binding; protein heterodimerization activity; cysteine-type endopeptidase activator activity involved in apoptotic process; phospholipid binding; protein kinase binding; lipid binding; protein phosphatase 2B binding; protein kinase B binding
Cellular component	cytoplasm; cytosol; membrane; mitochondrial outer membrane; mitochondrion
Biological process	positive regulation of T cell differentiation; cellular response to hypoxia; regulation of apoptotic process; response to amino acid; response to estradiol; response to hypoxia; positive regulation of type B pancreatic cell development; response to organic cyclic compound; extrinsic apoptotic signaling pathway; positive regulation of autophagy; glucose homeostasis; cytokine-mediated signaling pathway; response to testosterone; positive regulation of epithelial cell proliferation; positive regulation of B cell differentiation; response to progesterone; positive regulation of apoptotic process by virus; pore complex assembly; cellular response to nicotine; response to glucocorticoid; positive regulation of neuron death; response to glucose; regulation of cysteine-type endopeptidase activity involved in apoptotic process; response to organic substance; response to calcium ion; positive regulation of cysteine-type endopeptidase activity involved in apoptotic process; ATP metabolic process; cellular response to mechanical stimulus; activation of cysteine-type endopeptidase activity; regulation of mitochondrial membrane permeability; positive regulation of protein insertion into mitochondrial membrane involved in apoptotic signaling pathway; positive regulation of intrinsic apoptotic signaling pathway; positive regulation of glucokinase activity; spermatogenesis; glucose catabolic process; intrinsic apoptotic signaling pathway in response to DNA damage; positive regulation of proteolysis; cerebral cortex development; extrinsic apoptotic signaling pathway in absence of ligand; cellular response to lipid; positive regulation of release of cytochrome c from mitochondria; response to hormone; positive regulation of mitochondrial membrane potential; positive regulation of insulin secretion involved in cellular response to glucose stimulus; suppression by virus of host apoptotic process; response to ethanol; ADP metabolic process; activation of cysteine-type endopeptidase activity involved in apoptotic process; cell population proliferation; type B pancreatic cell proliferation; cellular response to chromate; extrinsic apoptotic signaling pathway via death domain receptors; response to hydrogen peroxide; response to oleic acid; release of cytochrome c from mitochondria; positive regulation of insulin secretion; apoptotic process; intrinsic apoptotic signaling pathway; apoptotic signaling pathway; protein insertion into mitochondrial membrane involved in apoptotic signaling pathway; positive regulation of intrinsic apoptotic signaling pathway in response to osmotic stress; positive regulation of apoptotic process; positive regulation of granulosa cell apoptotic process
Sources:Amigo / QuickGO
Orthologs
Databases	NCBI: entry; OMA: entry
Species	Human	Mouse
Entrez	572	12015
Ensembl	ENSG00000002330	ENSMUSG00000024959
UniProt	Q92934	Q61337
RefSeq (mRNA)	NM_032989; NM_004322	NM_007522; NM_001285453
RefSeq (protein)	NP_004313; NP_116784	NP_001272382; NP_031548
Location (UCSC)	Chr 11: 64.27 – 64.28 Mb	Chr 19: 6.92 – 6.93 Mb
PubMed search
- Wikidata
View/Edit Human	View/Edit Mouse

Pro-apoptotic Bcl-2 protein, BAD
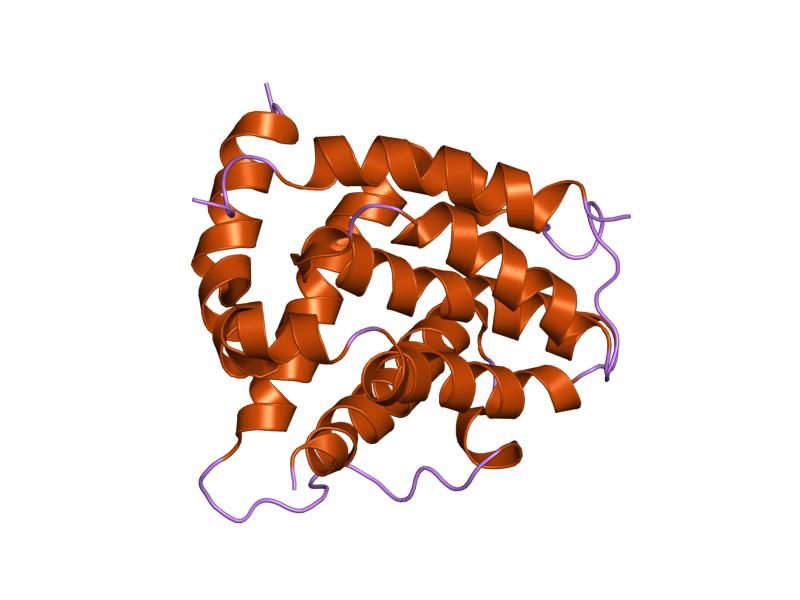
- complex of bcl-xl with peptide from bad

Identifiers
- Symbol: Bcl-2_BAD
- Pfam: PF10514
- InterPro: IPR018868
Available protein structures:
- PDB: IPR018868 PF10514 (ECOD; PDBsum)
- AlphaFold: IPR018868; PF10514

The BCL2 associated agonist of cell death (BAD) protein is a pro-apoptotic member of the Bcl-2 gene family which is involved in initiating apoptosis. BAD is a member of the BH3-only family, a subfamily of the Bcl-2 family. It does not contain a C-terminal transmembrane domain for outer mitochondrial membrane and nuclear envelope targeting, unlike most other members of the Bcl-2 family. After activation, it is able to form a heterodimer with anti-apoptotic proteins and prevent them from stopping apoptosis.

== Mechanism of action ==
Bax/Bak are believed to initiate apoptosis by forming a pore in the mitochondrial outer membrane that allows cytochrome c to escape into the cytoplasm and activate the pro-apoptotic caspase cascade. The anti-apoptotic Bcl-2 and Bcl-xL proteins inhibit cytochrome c release through the mitochondrial pore and also inhibit activation of the cytoplasmic caspase cascade by cytochrome c.

Dephosphorylated BAD forms a heterodimer with Bcl-2 and Bcl-xL, inactivating them and thus allowing Bax/Bak-triggered apoptosis. When BAD is phosphorylated by Akt/protein kinase B (triggered by PIP_{3}), it forms the BAD-(14-3-3) protein heterodimer. This leaves Bcl-2 free to inhibit Bax-triggered apoptosis. BAD phosphorylation is thus anti-apoptotic, and BAD dephosphorylation (e.g., by Ca^{2+}-stimulated Calcineurin) is pro-apoptotic. The latter may be involved in neural diseases such as schizophrenia.

== Interactions ==
Overview of signal transduction pathways involved with apoptosis.

Bcl-2-associated death promoter has been shown to interact with:

- BCL2L1
- BCL2A1
- BCL2L2
- Bcl-2
- MCL1
- S100A10
- YWHAQ and
- YWHAZ

== See also ==
- Programmed cell death
