= Lisaftoclax =

Chemical compound

Clinical data
- Other names: APG-2575

Identifiers
- IUPAC name: 4-[4-[[8-(4-chlorophenyl)spiro[3.5]non-7-en-7-yl]methyl]piperazin-1-yl]-N-[4-[[(2S)-1,4-dioxan-2-yl]methylamino]-3-nitrophenyl]sulfonyl-2-(1H-pyrrolo[2,3-b]pyridin-5-yloxy)benzamide
- CAS Number: 2180923-05-9
- PubChem CID: 137355972
- DrugBank: DB18054
- ChemSpider: 103835872
- UNII: OSL3FEZ1IF

Chemical and physical data
- Formula: C_{45}H_{48}ClN_{7}O_{8}S
- Molar mass: 882.43 g·mol^{−1}
- 3D model (JSmol): Interactive image
- SMILES: C1CC2(C1)CCC(=C(C2)C3=CC=C(C=C3)Cl)CN4CCN(CC4)C5=CC(=C(C=C5)C(=O)NS(=O)(=O)C6=CC(=C(C=C6)NC[C@H]7COCCO7)[N+](=O)[O-])OC8=CN=C9C(=C8)C=CN9
- InChI: InChI=InChI=1S/C45H48ClN7O8S/c46-33-4-2-30(3-5-33)39-25-45(12-1-13-45)14-10-32(39)28-51-16-18-52(19-17-51)34-6-8-38(42(23-34)61-35-22-31-11-15-47-43(31)49-26-35)44(54)50-62(57,58)37-7-9-40(41(24-37)53(55)56)48-27-36-29-59-20-21-60-36/h2-9,11,15,22-24,26,36,48H,1,10,12-14,16-21,25,27-29H2,(H,47,49)(H,50,54)/t36-/m0/s1; Key:FNBXDBIYRAPDPI-BHVANESWSA-N

Lisaftoclax is an investigational new drug being developed by Ascentage Pharma for the treatment of hematological malignancies, particularly chronic lymphocytic leukemia (CLL) and small lymphocytic lymphoma (SLL). It is a selective inhibitor of the B-cell lymphoma 2 (BCL-2) protein, designed to restore the normal process of programmed cell death (apoptosis) in cancer cells. As of 2024, lisaftoclax is undergoing multiple Phase 3 clinical trials, including studies in combination with BTK inhibitors for relapsed/refractory CLL/SLL.

In July 2025, lisaftoclax was approved in China for the treatment of CLL or SLL in adult patients who had received at least one prior systemic therapy.
