= Bcl-xL =

Transmembrane molecule in the mitochondria

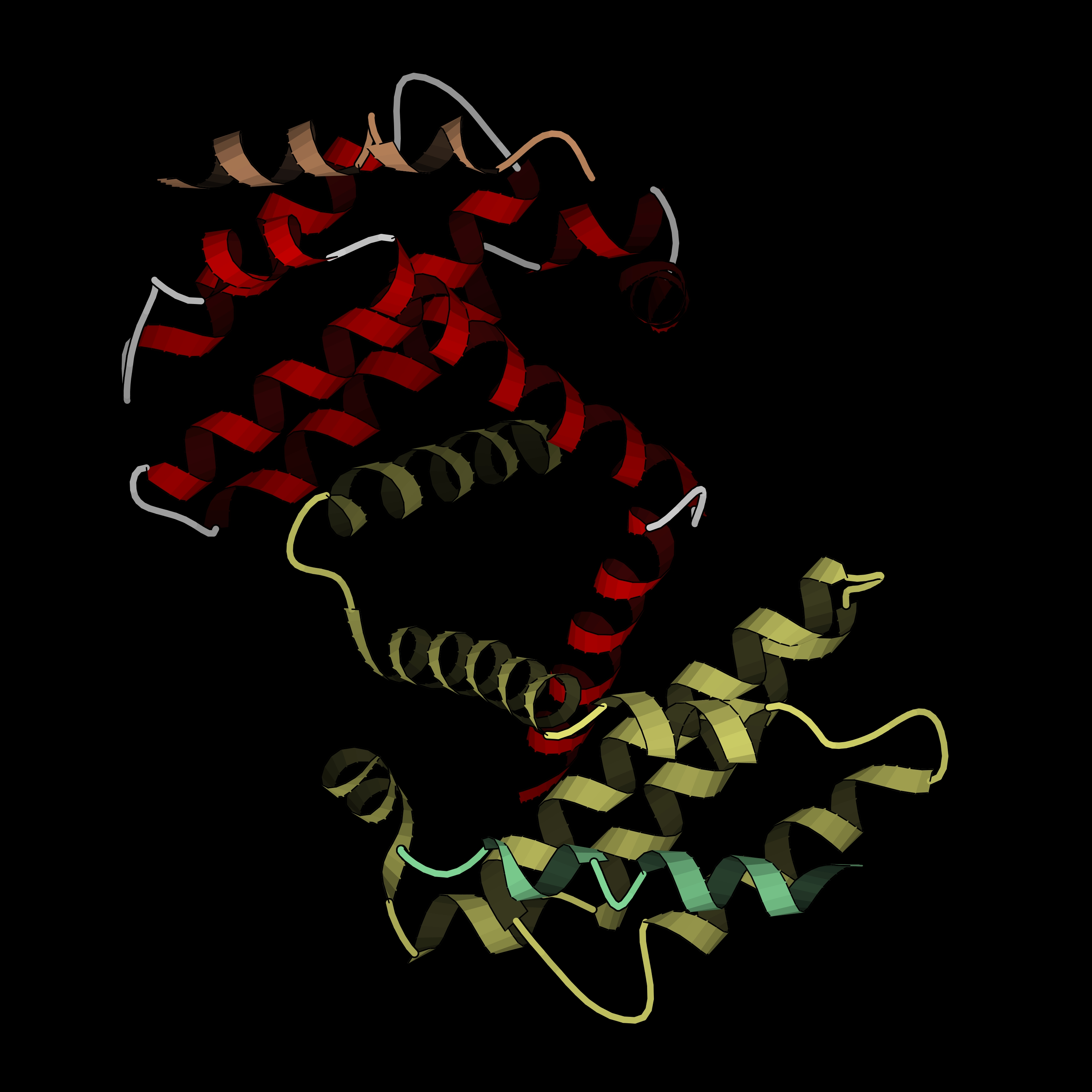
X-ray crystal structure of Bcl-xL with 1.76 Å resolution

B-cell lymphoma-extra large (Bcl-xL), encoded by the BCL2-like 1 gene, is a transmembrane molecule in the mitochondria. It is a member of the Bcl-2 family of proteins, and acts as an anti-apoptotic protein by preventing the release of mitochondrial contents such as cytochrome c, which leads to caspase activation and ultimately, programmed cell death.

== Function ==
It is a well-established concept in the field of apoptosis that relative amounts of pro- and anti-survival Bcl-2 family of proteins determine whether the cell will undergo cell death; if more Bcl-xL is present, then pores are non-permeable to pro-apoptotic molecules and the cell survives. However, if Bax and Bak become activated, and Bcl-xL is sequestered away by gatekeeper BH3-only factors (e.g. Bim) causing a pore to form, cytochrome c is released leading to initiation of caspase cascade and apoptotic events.

While the exact signaling pathway of Bcl-xL is still not known, it is believed that Bcl-xL differs highly from Bcl-2 in their mechanism of inducing apoptosis. Bcl-xL is about ten times more functional than Bcl-2 when induced by the chemotherapy drug, Doxorubicin and can specifically bind to cytochrome C residues, preventing apoptosis. It can also prevent the formation of Apaf-1 and Caspase 9 complex by acting directly upon Apaf-1 rather than Caspase 9, as shown in nematode homologs. Growth factor independence 1 (Gfi1) upregulates the expression of the pro-survival Bcl-2 family member Bcl-xL in hematopoietic system. Its expression is upregulated by Gfi1 via Hemgn to promote cell survival.

Overview of signal transduction pathways

== Clinical significance ==
Bcl-xL dysfunction in mice can cause ineffective production of red blood cells, severe anemia, hemolysis, and death. This protein has also been shown as a requirement for heme production and in erythroid lineage, Bcl-xL is a major survival factor responsible for an estimated half of the total survival "signal" proerythroblasts must receive in order to survive and become red cells. Bcl-xL promoter contains GATA-1 and Stat5 sites. This protein accumulates throughout the differentiation, ensuring the survival of erythroid progenitors. Because iron metabolism and incorporation into hemoglobin occurs inside the mitochondria, Bcl-xL was suggested to play additional roles in regulating this process in erythrocytes which could lead to a role in polycythemia vera, a disease where there is an overproduction of erythrocytes.

Similar to other Bcl-2 family members, Bcl-xL has been implicated in the survival of cancer cells by inhibiting the function of p53, a tumor suppressor. In cancerous mouse cells, those which contained Bcl-xL were able to survive while those that only expressed p53 died in a small period of time.

Bcl-xL is a target of various senolytic agents. Studies of cell cultures of senescent human umbilical vein endothelial cells have shown that both fisetin and quercetin induce apoptosis by inhibition of Bcl-xL. Fisetin has roughly twice the senolytic potency as quercetin.

== Related proteins ==
Other Bcl-2 proteins include Bcl-2, Bcl-w, Bcl-xs, and Mcl-1.
