= Harry Caray (disambiguation) =

Harry Caray may refer to:

- Harry Caray (1914–1998), American sportscaster
- Skip Caray (1939–2008), his son, born Harry Caray, Jr. and also a sportscaster
- Chip Caray (born 1965), his grandson, born Harry Caray III and also a sportscaster

== See also ==
- Harry Carey (disambiguation)
