= BCL2L2 =

Protein-coding gene in the species Homo sapiens

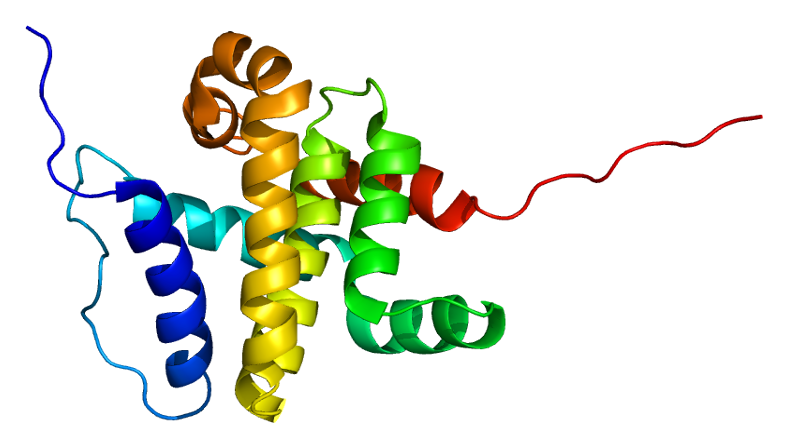

Identifiers
- Aliases: BCL2L2, BCL-W, BCL2-L-2, BCLW, PPP1R51, BCL2 like 2
- External IDs: OMIM: 601931; MGI: 108052; GeneCards: BCL2L2
Available structures
PDB	Ortholog search: PDBe RCSB
PDB	List of PDB id codes 1MK3, 1O0L, 1ZY3, 2Y6W, 4CIM

Gene location (Human)
Chr.	Chromosome 14 (human)
Band	14q11.2	Start	23,298,790 bp
Band	14q11.2	End	23,311,751 bp

Gene location (Mouse)
Chr.	Chromosome 14 (mouse)
Band	14 C3|14 27.98 cM	Start	55,120,834 bp
Band	14 C3|14 27.98 cM	End	55,125,691 bp
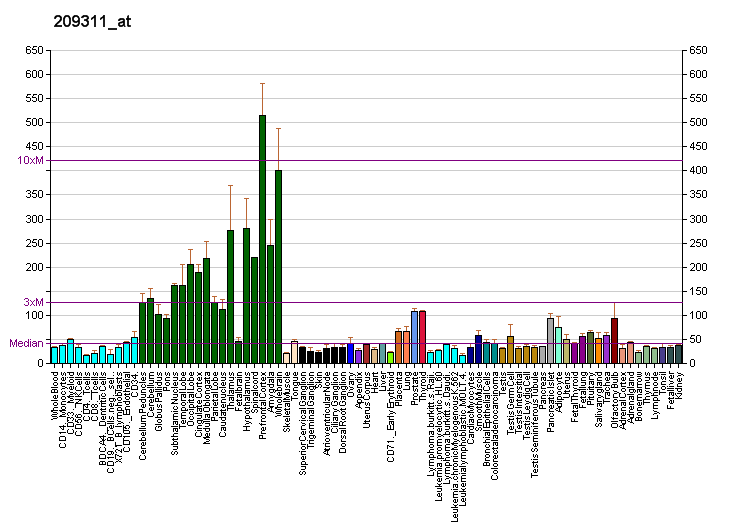
RNA expression pattern
Bgee	Human / Mouse (ortholog); Top expressed in: C1 segment; prefrontal cortex; amygdala; right frontal lobe; postcentral gyrus; lateral nuclear group of thalamus; Brodmann area 9; orbitofrontal cortex; cingulate gyrus; muscle layer of sigmoid colon / Top expressed in: medial dorsal nucleus; lobe of cerebellum; habenula; subiculum; cerebellar vermis; medial geniculate nucleus; pontine nuclei; ventral tegmental area; medial vestibular nucleus; lateral geniculate nucleus; More reference expression data
BioGPS	More reference expression data
Gene ontology
Molecular function	protein binding; protein homodimerization activity; disordered domain specific binding; identical protein binding; protein heterodimerization activity; BH domain binding
Cellular component	cytoplasm; cytosol; mitochondrial membranes; mitochondrion; membrane; mitochondrial outer membrane; Bcl-2 family protein complex; nucleus; nuclear inclusion body
Biological process	spermatogenesis; regulation of apoptotic process; negative regulation of apoptotic process; Sertoli cell proliferation; apoptotic process; intrinsic apoptotic signaling pathway in response to DNA damage; extrinsic apoptotic signaling pathway in absence of ligand; negative regulation of intrinsic apoptotic signaling pathway; cellular response to estradiol stimulus; cellular response to amyloid-beta
Sources:Amigo / QuickGO
Orthologs
Databases	NCBI: entry; OMA: entry
Species	Human	Mouse
Entrez	599	12050
Ensembl	ENSG00000129473	ENSMUSG00000089682
UniProt	Q92843	P70345
RefSeq (mRNA)	NM_004050; NM_001199839	NM_007537
RefSeq (protein)	NP_001186768; NP_004041	NP_031563
Location (UCSC)	Chr 14: 23.3 – 23.31 Mb	Chr 14: 55.12 – 55.13 Mb
PubMed search
- Wikidata
View/Edit Human	View/Edit Mouse

Bcl-2-like protein 2 is a 193-amino acid protein that in humans is encoded by the BCL2L2 gene on chromosome 14 (band q11.2-q12). It was originally discovered by Leonie Gibson, Suzanne Cory and colleagues at the Walter and Eliza Hall Institute of Medical Research, who called it Bcl-w.

== Function ==
This gene encodes a pro-survival (anti-apoptotic) member of the Bcl-2 protein family, and is most similar to Bcl-xL. The proteins of this family form hetero- or homodimers and act as anti- and pro-apoptotic regulators. Expression of this gene in cells has been shown to contribute to reduced cell apoptosis under cytotoxic conditions. Studies of the related gene in mice indicated a role in the survival of NGF- and BDNF-dependent neurons. Mutation and knockout studies of the mouse gene demonstrated an essential role in adult spermatogenesis.

== Clinical significance ==
High levels of Bcl-w are seen in many cancers, including glioblastoma, colorectal cancer, non-small-cell lung carcinoma, and breast cancer. Breast cancer patients with metastasis have higher Bcl-w than breast cancer patients only having primary tumor. Elevated levels of Bcl-w has been shown to protect neurons from cell death induced by amyloid beta. Parkinson's disease patients with a mutant PARK2 gene have elevated Bcl-w. Bcl-w has been shown to contribute to cellular senescence.

Quercetin has been shown to inhibit the PI3K/AKT pathway leading to downregulation of Bcl-w.

== Interactions ==
BCL2L2 has been shown to interact with:

- BCL2L11
- BAD, and
- PPP1CA.
