= Oblimersen =

Chemical compound

Clinical data
- Trade names: Genasense
- Other names: G3139
- ATC code: L01XX36 (WHO)

Legal status
- Legal status: Not marketed

Identifiers
- IUPAC name: all-P-ambo-P-thiothymidylyl-(3'→5')-2'-deoxy-P-thiocytidylyl-(3'→5')-P-thiothymidylyl-(3'→5')-2'-deoxy-P-thiocytidylyl-(3'→5')-2'-deoxy-P-thiocytidylyl-(3'→5')-2'-deoxy-P-thiocytidylyl-(3'→5')-2'-deoxy-P-thioadenylyl-(3'→5')-2'-deoxy-P-thioguanylyl-(3'→5')-2'-deoxy-P-thiocytidylyl-(3'→5')-2'-deoxy-P-thioguanylyl-(3'→5')-P-thiothymidylyl-(3'→5')-2'-deoxy-P-thioguanylyl-(3'→5')-2'-deoxy-P-thiocytidylyl-(3'→5')-2'-deoxy-P-thioguanylyl-(3'→5')-2'-deoxy-P-thiocytidylyl-(3'→5')-2'-deoxy-P-thiocytidylyl-(3'→5')-2'-deoxy-P-thioadenylyl-(3'→5')-thymidine
- CAS Number: 190977-41-4
- PubChem CID: Oblimersen
- ChemSpider: 34980574
- UNII: 85J5ZP6YSL
- CompTox Dashboard (EPA): DTXSID60172611

Chemical and physical data
- Formula: C_{172}H_{221}N_{62}O_{91}P_{17}S_{17}
- Molar mass: 5684.58 g·mol^{−1}
- SMILES: Cc1cn(c(=O)[nH]c1=O)[C@H]2C[C@@H]([C@H](O2)COP(=O)(O[C@H]3C[C@@H](O[C@@H]3COP(=O)(O[C@H]4C[C@@H](O[C@@H]4COP(=O)(O[C@H]5C[C@@H](O[C@@H]5COP(=O)(O[C@H]6C[C@@H](O[C@@H]6COP(=O)(O[C@H]7C[C@@H](O[C@@H]7COP(=O)(O[C@H]8C[C@@H](O[C@@H]8COP(=O)(O[C@H]9C[C@@H](O[C@@H]9COP(=O)(O[C@H]1C[C@@H](O[C@@H]1COP(=O)(O[C@H]1C[C@@H](O[C@@H]1COP(=O)(O[C@H]1C[C@@H](O[C@@H]1COP(=O)(O[C@H]1C[C@@H](O[C@@H]1COP(=O)(O[C@H]1C[C@@H](O[C@@H]1COP(=O)(O[C@H]1C[C@@H](O[C@@H]1COP(=O)(O[C@H]1C[C@@H](O[C@@H]1COP(=O)(O[C@H]1C[C@@H](O[C@@H]1COP(=O)(O[C@H]1C[C@@H](O[C@@H]1COP(=O)(O[C@H]1C[C@@H](O[C@@H]1CO)n1cc(c(=O)[nH]c1=O)C)S)n1ccc(nc1=O)N)S)n1cc(c(=O)[nH]c1=O)C)S)n1ccc(nc1=O)N)S)n1ccc(nc1=O)N)S)n1ccc(nc1=O)N)S)n1cnc2c1ncnc2N)S)n1cnc2c1nc([nH]c2=O)N)S)n1ccc(nc1=O)N)S)n1cnc2c1nc([nH]c2=O)N)S)n1cc(c(=O)[nH]c1=O)C)S)n1cnc2c1nc([nH]c2=O)N)S)n1ccc(nc1=O)N)S)n1cnc2c1nc([nH]c2=O)N)S)n1ccc(nc1=O)N)S)n1ccc(nc1=O)N)S)n1cnc2c1ncnc2N)S)O
- InChI: InChI=1S/C172H221N62O91P17S17/c1-69-39-225(169(253)213-149(69)237)117-21-73(236)92(292-117)44-274-326(257,343)320-85-33-129(229-63-191-135-141(181)187-61-189-143(135)229)303-103(85)55-285-332(263,349)314-79-27-122(221-17-9-113(177)201-165(221)249)295-95(79)47-278-330(261,347)312-78-26-121(220-16-8-112(176)200-164(220)248)298-98(78)50-280-338(269,355)322-87-35-131(231-65-193-137-145(231)205-157(183)209-153(137)241)305-105(87)57-287-334(265,351)316-81-29-124(223-19-11-115(179)203-167(223)251)299-99(81)51-281-339(270,356)323-88-36-132(232-66-194-138-146(232)206-158(184)210-154(138)242)307-107(88)59-289-337(268,354)319-84-32-128(228-42-72(4)152(240)216-172(228)256)302-102(84)54-284-341(272,358)325-90-38-134(234-68-196-140-148(234)208-160(186)212-156(140)244)306-106(90)58-288-335(266,352)317-82-30-125(224-20-12-116(180)204-168(224)252)300-100(82)52-282-340(271,357)324-89-37-133(233-67-195-139-147(233)207-159(185)211-155(139)243)308-108(89)60-290-342(273,359)321-86-34-130(230-64-192-136-142(182)188-62-190-144(136)230)304-104(86)56-286-333(264,350)315-80-28-123(222-18-10-114(178)202-166(222)250)296-96(80)48-277-328(259,345)310-76-24-119(218-14-6-110(174)198-162(218)246)294-94(76)46-276-329(260,346)311-77-25-120(219-15-7-111(175)199-163(219)247)297-97(77)49-279-336(267,353)318-83-31-127(227-41-71(3)151(239)215-171(227)255)301-101(83)53-283-331(262,348)313-75-23-118(217-13-5-109(173)197-161(217)245)293-93(75)45-275-327(258,344)309-74-22-126(291-91(74)43-235)226-40-70(2)150(238)214-170(226)254/h5-20,39-42,61-68,73-108,117-134,235-236H,21-38,43-60H2,1-4H3,(H,257,343)(H,258,344)(H,259,345)(H,260,346)(H,261,347)(H,262,348)(H,263,349)(H,264,350)(H,265,351)(H,266,352)(H,267,353)(H,268,354)(H,269,355)(H,270,356)(H,271,357)(H,272,358)(H,273,359)(H2,173,197,245)(H2,174,198,246)(H2,175,199,247)(H2,176,200,248)(H2,177,201,249)(H2,178,202,250)(H2,179,203,251)(H2,180,204,252)(H2,181,187,189)(H2,182,188,190)(H,213,237,253)(H,214,238,254)(H,215,239,255)(H,216,240,256)(H3,183,205,209,241)(H3,184,206,210,242)(H3,185,207,211,243)(H3,186,208,212,244)/t73-,74-,75-,76-,77-,78-,79-,80-,81-,82-,83-,84-,85-,86-,87-,88-,89-,90-,91+,92+,93+,94+,95+,96+,97+,98+,99+,100+,101+,102+,103+,104+,105+,106+,107+,108+,117+,118+,119+,120+,121+,122+,123+,124+,125+,126+,127+,128+,129+,130+,131+,132+,133+,134+,326?,327?,328?,329?,330?,331?,332?,333?,334?,335?,336?,337?,338?,339?,340?,341?,342?/m0/s1; Key:MIMNFCVQODTQDP-NDLVEFNKSA-N

Oblimersen (INN, trade name Genasense; also known as Augmerosen and bcl-2 antisense oligodeoxynucleotide G3139) is an antisense oligodeoxyribonucleotide being studied as a possible treatment for several types of cancer, including chronic lymphocytic leukemia, B-cell lymphoma, and breast cancer. It may kill cancer cells by blocking the production of Bcl-2—a protein that makes cancer cells live longer—and by making them more sensitive to chemotherapy.

== History ==
The antisense oligonucleotide drug oblimersen was developed by Genta Incorporated to target Bcl-2. An antisense DNA or RNA strand is non-coding and complementary to the coding strand (which is the template for producing respectively RNA or protein). An antisense drug is a short sequence of RNA which hybridises with and inactivates mRNA, preventing the protein from being formed.

It was shown that the proliferation of human lymphoma cells (with t(14;18) translocation) could be inhibited by antisense RNA targeted at the start codon region of Bcl-2 mRNA. In vitro studies led to the identification of oblimersen, which is complementary to the first 6 codons of Bcl-2 mRNA.

These have shown successful results in Phase I/II trials for lymphoma, and a large Phase III trial was launched in 2004.

By the first quarter 2010, the drug had not received FDA approval due to disappointing results in a melanoma trial. Although its safety and efficacy have not been established for any use, Genta Incorporated still claims on its website that studies are currently under way to examine the potential role of oblimersen in a variety of clinical indications.

Recent studies in 2023 continue to explore the potential of oblimersen in combination with other therapies. Preclinical models have demonstrated that oblimersen, when combined with vinorelbine, significantly inhibits tumor growth and prolongs survival in NSCLC. These findings suggest that combining oblimersen with other chemotherapeutic agents could enhance its efficacy and potentially overcome previous clinical challenges.
