= Henry Cary =

Henry Cary may refer to:

- Henry Cary, 1st Viscount Falkland (1575–1633), coloniser and military officer
- Henry Cary, 4th Viscount Falkland (1634–1663), English politician who sat in the House of Commons, 1659–1663
- Henry Cary, 8th Viscount Falkland (1766–1796), peer and British Army officer
- Henry Francis Cary (1772–1844), English author and translator
- Henry Cary (judge) (1804–1870), English-born judge, classical scholar and Anglican clergyman active in Australia
- Henry Cary Jr. (c. 1650–1750), Virginia builder
- Henry Cary (Archdeacon of Killala)

== See also ==
- Henry Carey (disambiguation)
- Henry Carey, 2nd Earl of Monmouth (1596–1661)
