= Henry Carey =

Henry Carey may refer to:

- Henry Carey, 1st Baron Hunsdon (1526–1596), politician, general, and potential illegitimate son of Henry VIII
- Henry Carey, 1st Earl of Dover (1580–1666), English peer
- Henry Carey, 2nd Earl of Monmouth (1596–1661), English nobleman
- Henry Carey (died 1581), MP for Buckingham and Berwick-upon-Tweed
- Henry Carey (writer) (1687–1743), dramatist and songwriter
- Henry Charles Carey (1793–1879), American economist
- Henry Ernest Carey (1874–1964), British-born Australian public servant

== See also ==
- Henry Cary (disambiguation)
- Harry Carey (disambiguation)
- Harry Caray (1914–1998), broadcaster
