= BCL2-interacting killer =

Protein-coding gene in the species Homo sapiens

BIK

Identifiers
- Aliases: BIK, BIP1, BP4, NBK, BCL2 interacting killer
- External IDs: OMIM: 603392; MGI: 1206591; GeneCards: BIK
Available structures
PDB	Ortholog search: PDBe RCSB
PDB	List of PDB id codes 2IPE

Gene location (Human)
Chr.	Chromosome 22 (human)
Band	22q13.2	Start	43,110,750 bp
Band	22q13.2	End	43,129,712 bp

Gene location (Mouse)
Chr.	Chromosome 15 (mouse)
Band	15|15 E1	Start	83,411,063 bp
Band	15|15 E1	End	83,428,835 bp
RNA expression pattern
Bgee	Human / Mouse (ortholog); Top expressed in: nasal epithelium; olfactory zone of nasal mucosa; palpebral conjunctiva; mucosa of transverse colon; gonad; epithelium of bronchus; bronchial epithelial cell; mucosa of sigmoid colon; minor salivary glands; mucosa of paranasal sinus / Top expressed in: right kidney; lumbar spinal ganglion; proximal tubule; embryo; conjunctival fornix; primary oocyte; zygote; transitional epithelium of urinary bladder; right lung lobe; lumbar subsegment of spinal cord; More reference expression data
BioGPS	n/a
Gene ontology
Molecular function	protein binding; BH domain binding; protein heterodimerization activity
Cellular component	integral component of membrane; endomembrane system; mitochondrial membranes; mitochondrion; membrane
Biological process	regulation of apoptotic process; positive regulation of protein homooligomerization; positive regulation of release of cytochrome c from mitochondria; apoptotic process; male gonad development; apoptotic mitochondrial changes
Sources:Amigo / QuickGO
Orthologs
Databases	NCBI: entry; OMA: entry
Species	Human	Mouse
Entrez	638	12124
Ensembl	ENSG00000100290	ENSMUSG00000016758
UniProt	Q13323	O70337
RefSeq (mRNA)	NM_001197	NM_007546
RefSeq (protein)	NP_001188; NP_001188.1	NP_031572
Location (UCSC)	Chr 22: 43.11 – 43.13 Mb	Chr 15: 83.41 – 83.43 Mb
PubMed search
- Wikidata
View/Edit Human	View/Edit Mouse

BCL2-interacting killer is a protein that in humans is encoded by the BIK gene.

== Function ==
The protein encoded by this gene is known to interact with cellular and viral survival-promoting proteins, such as BCL2 and the Epstein–Barr virus in order to enhance programmed cell death. Because its activity is suppressed in the presence of survival-promoting proteins, this protein is suggested as a likely target for antiapoptotic proteins. This protein shares a critical BH3 domain with other death-promoting proteins, BAX and BAK.

== Interactions ==
Bcl-2-interacting killer has been shown to interact with BCL2-like 1 and Bcl-2.
