= Lonitoclax =

Investigational drug

Clinical data
- Other names: ZE50-0134

Identifiers
- IUPAC name: 5-[5-chloro-2-[(3S)-3-(morpholin-4-ylmethyl)-3,4-dihydro-1H-isoquinoline-2-carbonyl]phenyl]-N-(4-hydroxyphenyl)-N-[(3-methoxy-2-methylphenyl)methyl]-1,2-dimethylpyrrole-3-carboxamide
- CAS Number: 2952589-57-8
- PubChem CID: 168969724
- ChemSpider: 133325962
- UNII: 76NBC3X6A3

Chemical and physical data
- Formula: C_{43}H_{45}ClN_{4}O_{5}
- Molar mass: 733.31 g·mol^{−1}
- 3D model (JSmol): Interactive image
- SMILES: CC1=C(C=CC=C1OC)CN(C2=CC=C(C=C2)O)C(=O)C3=C(N(C(=C3)C4=C(C=CC(=C4)Cl)C(=O)N5CC6=CC=CC=C6C[C@H]5CN7CCOCC7)C)C
- InChI: InChI=InChI=1S/C43H45ClN4O5/c1-28-31(10-7-11-41(28)52-4)25-47(34-13-15-36(49)16-14-34)43(51)38-24-40(45(3)29(38)2)39-23-33(44)12-17-37(39)42(50)48-26-32-9-6-5-8-30(32)22-35(48)27-46-18-20-53-21-19-46/h5-17,23-24,35,49H,18-22,25-27H2,1-4H3/t35-/m0/s1; Key:CEWHUBSABMOQQC-DHUJRADRSA-N

Lonitoclax is an investigational new drug that is being evaluated by Lomond Therapeutics for the treatment of acute myeloid leukemia (AML) and chronic lymphocytic leukaemia (CML). It acts as an Bcl-2 inhibitor.
