= Bcl-2-like protein 1 =

Protein-coding gene in the species Homo sapiens

BCL2L1
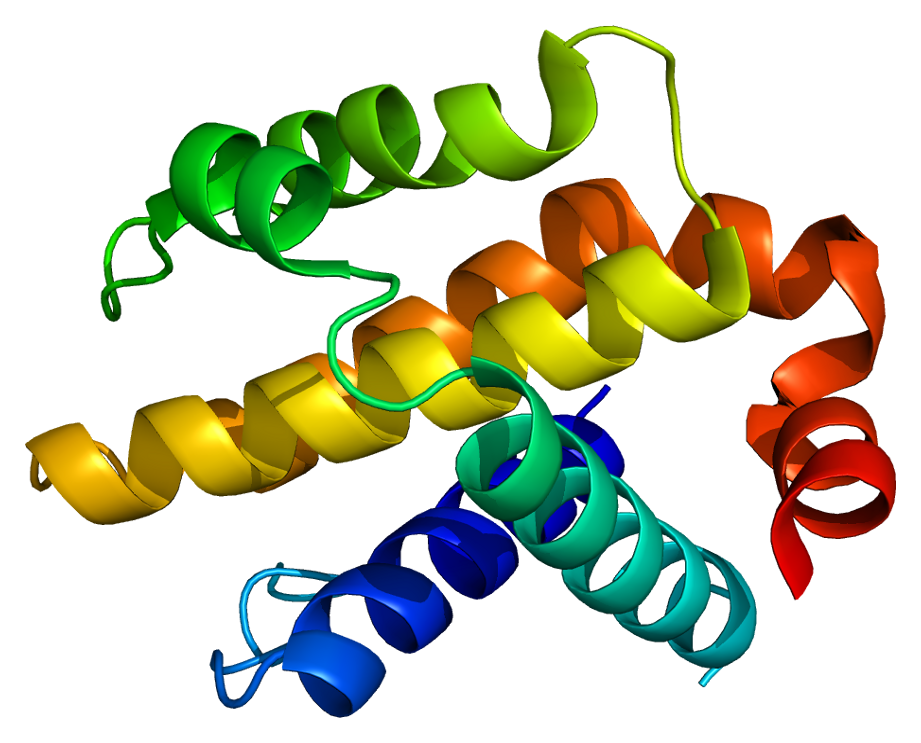

Identifiers
- Aliases: BCL2L1, Bcl2l1, Bcl(X)L, Bcl-XL, Bcl2l, BclX, bcl-x, bcl2-L-1, BCL-XL/S, BCLXL, BCLXS, PPP1R52, bcl-xS, BCL2L, BCLX, Bcl-X, bcl-xL, BCL2 like 1
- External IDs: OMIM: 600039; MGI: 88139; GeneCards: BCL2L1
Available structures
| PDB | Ortholog search: PDBe RCSB |
| PDB | List of PDB id codes 1BXL, 1G5J, 1LXL, 1MAZ, 1R2D, 1R2E, 1R2G, 1R2H, 1R2I, 1YSG, 1YSI, 1YSN, 2B48, 2LP8, 2LPC, 2M03, 2M04, 2ME8, 2ME9, 2MEJ, 2O1Y, 2O2M, 2O2N, 2P1L, 2PON, 2YJ1, 2YQ6, 2YQ7, 2YXJ, 3CVA, 3FDL, 3FDM, 3INQ, 3IO8, 3PL7, 3QKD, 3R85, 3SP7, 3SPF, 3WIZ, 3ZK6, 3ZLN, 3ZLO, 3ZLR, 4A1U, 4A1W, 4AQ3, 4BPK, 4C52, 4C5D, 4CIN, 4EHR, 4HNJ, 4IEH, 4PPI, 4QVE, 4QVF, 4QVX, 4TUH, 5AGW, 5AGX, 4Z9V, 5FMK, 5FMJ, 5C3G |

Gene location (Human)
| Chr. | Chromosome 20 (human) |
| Band | 20q11.21 | Start | 31,664,452 bp |
| Band | 20q11.21 | End | 31,723,989 bp |

Gene location (Mouse)
| Chr. | Chromosome 2 (mouse) |
| Band | 2 75.41 cM|2 H1 | Start | 152,622,588 bp |
| Band | 2 75.41 cM|2 H1 | End | 152,673,648 bp |
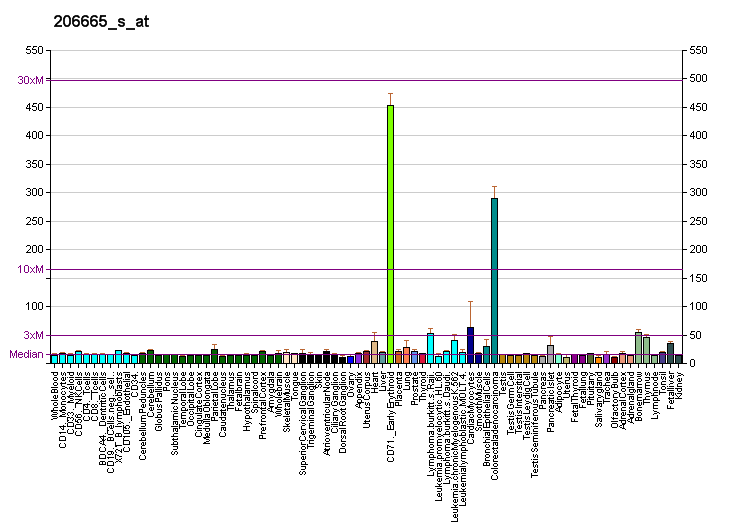

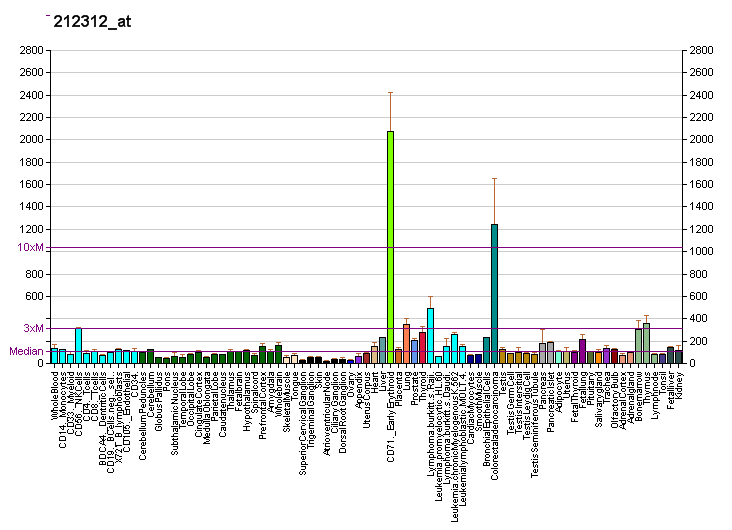

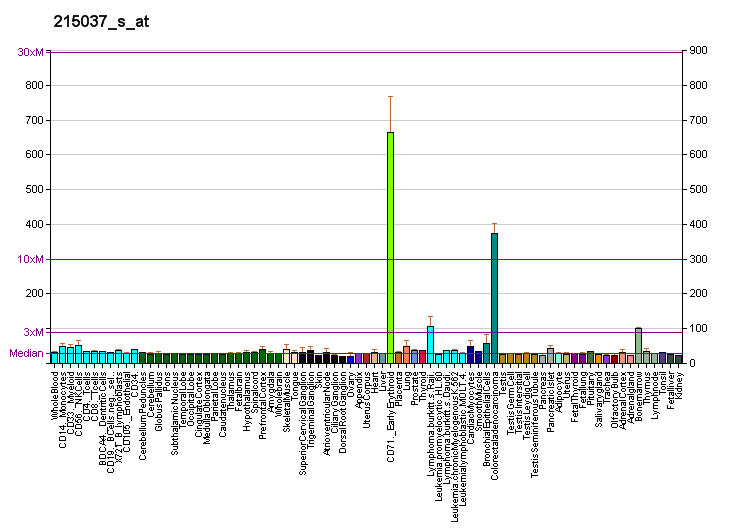
RNA expression pattern
| Bgee | Human / Mouse (ortholog); Top expressed in: right lung; olfactory zone of nasal mucosa; upper lobe of left lung; Descending thoracic aorta; ascending aorta; right coronary artery; islet of Langerhans; monocyte; left coronary artery; gallbladder / Top expressed in: spermatocyte; fetal liver hematopoietic progenitor cell; blood; tibiofemoral joint; dentate gyrus of hippocampal formation granule cell; primary visual cortex; superior frontal gyrus; vestibular membrane of cochlear duct; spermatid; thymus; More reference expression data |
| BioGPS | More reference expression data |
Gene ontology
| Molecular function | BH3 domain binding; protein binding; identical protein binding; protein kinase binding; protein homodimerization activity; protein heterodimerization activity |
| Cellular component | cytoplasm; integral component of membrane; cytosol; centrosome; nuclear membrane; mitochondrial membranes; membrane; Bcl-2 family protein complex; synapse; intracellular anatomical structure; synaptic vesicle membrane; microtubule organizing center; cell junction; mitochondrial matrix; mitochondrion; mitochondrial inner membrane; cytoskeleton; cytoplasmic vesicle; nucleus; endoplasmic reticulum; mitochondrial outer membrane |
| Biological process | negative regulation of neuron apoptotic process; neuron apoptotic process; germ cell development; negative regulation of execution phase of apoptosis; regulation of apoptotic process; response to cytokine; male gonad development; endocytosis; negative regulation of intrinsic apoptotic signaling pathway; mitotic cell cycle checkpoint signaling; negative regulation of release of cytochrome c from mitochondria; response to virus; negative regulation of apoptotic process; response to cycloheximide; in utero embryonic development; cellular response to alkaloid; negative regulation of intrinsic apoptotic signaling pathway in response to DNA damage; regulation of mitochondrial membrane potential; regulation of mitochondrial membrane permeability; apoptotic mitochondrial changes; cellular response to gamma radiation; spermatogenesis; positive regulation of cell population proliferation; positive regulation of apoptotic process; cellular response to amino acid stimulus; ovarian follicle development; apoptotic process in bone marrow cell; fertilization; response to radiation; suppression by virus of host apoptotic process; cell population proliferation; mitochondrion morphogenesis; negative regulation of extrinsic apoptotic signaling pathway in absence of ligand; negative regulation of autophagy; positive regulation of intrinsic apoptotic signaling pathway; negative regulation of anoikis; hepatocyte apoptotic process; release of cytochrome c from mitochondria; intrinsic apoptotic signaling pathway in response to DNA damage; extrinsic apoptotic signaling pathway in absence of ligand; apoptotic process; negative regulation of extrinsic apoptotic signaling pathway via death domain receptors; growth; negative regulation of protein localization to plasma membrane; cytokine-mediated signaling pathway; regulation of cytokinesis; regulation of growth; negative regulation of endoplasmic reticulum stress-induced intrinsic apoptotic signaling pathway |
Sources:Amigo / QuickGO
Orthologs
| Databases | NCBI: entry; OMA: entry |
| Species | Human | Mouse |
| Entrez | 598 | 12048 |
| Ensembl | ENSG00000171552 | ENSMUSG00000007659 |
| UniProt | Q07817; Q5TE64 | Q64373 |
| RefSeq (mRNA) | NM_001191; NM_138578; NM_001317919; NM_001317920; NM_001317921 NM_001322239; NM_001322240; NM_001322242 | NM_001289716; NM_001289717; NM_001289739; NM_009743; NM_001355053 |
| RefSeq (protein) | NP_001182; NP_001304848; NP_001304849; NP_001304850; NP_001309168 NP_001309169; NP_001309171; NP_612815 | NP_001276645; NP_001276646; NP_001276668; NP_033873; NP_001341982 |
| Location (UCSC) | Chr 20: 31.66 – 31.72 Mb | Chr 2: 152.62 – 152.67 Mb |
| PubMed search |
- Wikidata
| View/Edit Human | View/Edit Mouse |

Bcl-2-like protein 1 is a protein encoded in humans by the BCL2L1 gene. Through alternative splicing, the gene encodes both of the human proteins Bcl-xL and Bcl-xS.

== Function ==
The protein encoded by this gene belongs to the Bcl-2 protein family. Bcl-2 family members form hetero- or homodimers and act as anti- or pro-apoptotic regulators that are involved in a wide variety of cellular activities. The proteins encoded by this gene are located at the outer mitochondrial membrane, and have been shown to regulate outer mitochondrial membrane channel (voltage-dependent anion channels (VDACs) opening. VDACs regulate mitochondrial membrane potential, and thus controls the production of reactive oxygen species and release of cytochrome C by mitochondria, both of which are the potent inducers of cell apoptosis. Two alternatively spliced transcript variants, which encode distinct isoforms, have been reported. The longer isoform (Bcl-xL) acts as an apoptotic inhibitor and the shorter form (Bcl-xS) acts as an apoptotic activator.

== Interactions ==
BCL2-like 1 (gene) has been shown to interact with:

- APAF1,
- BAK1,
- BCAP31,
- BCL2L11,
- BNIP3,
- BNIPL,
- BAD,
- BAX,
- BIK,
- Bcl-2,
- HRK,
- IKZF3,
- Noxa,
- PPP1CA,
- PSEN2
- RAD9A,
- RTN1,
- RTN4, and
- VDAC1.
