= Harakiri (ski piste) =

Ski piste in Tyrol, Austria

Coordinates: 47.1725°N 11.8053°E

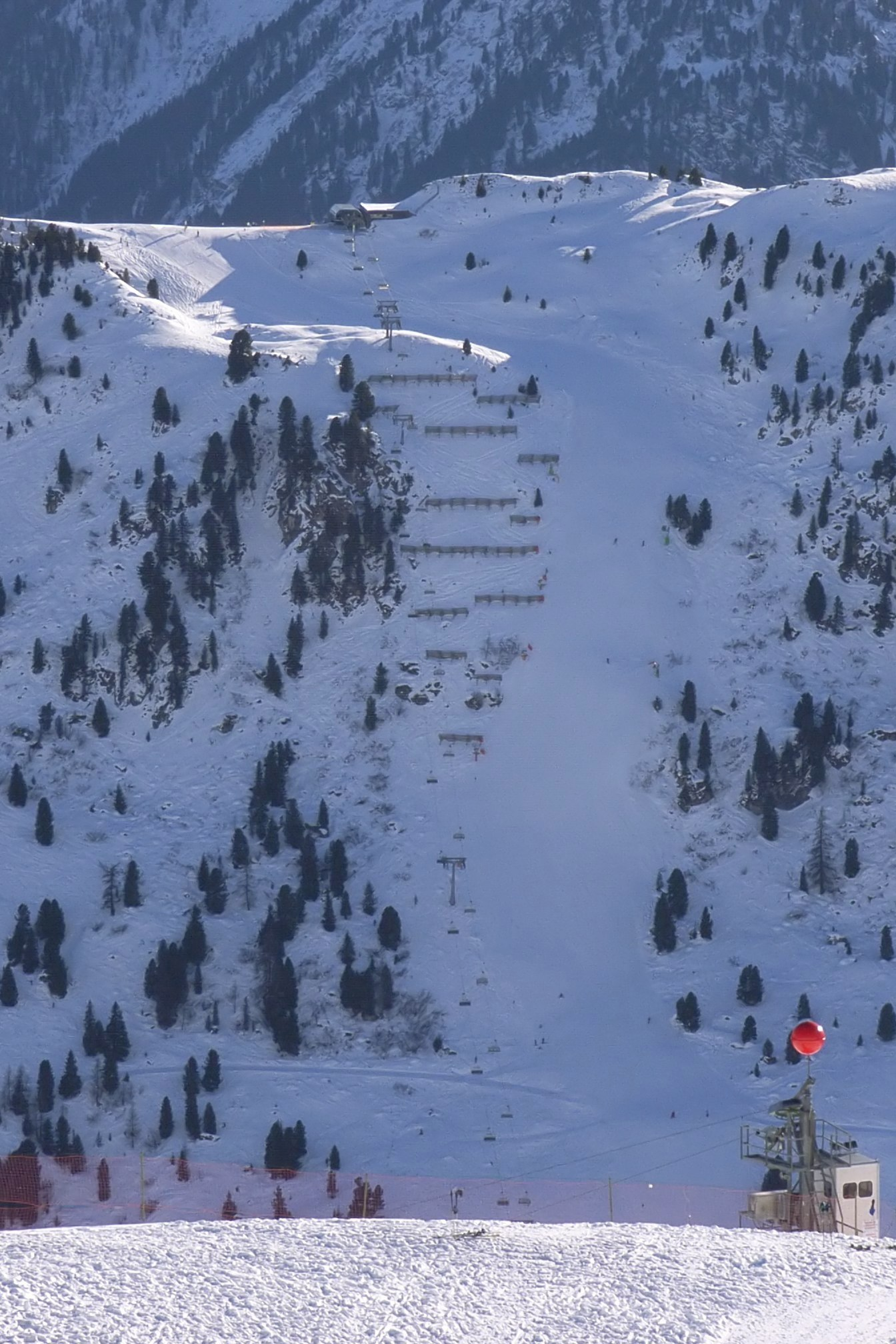
Mayrhofen Harakiri-Piste

The Harakiri is a slope in the ski resort of Mayrhofen Ski Zillertal 3000. It is named after the Japanese vulgar term for seppuku, ritual suicide by samurai. With incline of up to 78% (38 degrees), vertical drop of 375 metres and a length of about 1500 metres, it is one of the steepest groomed slope in Austria. Thus the slope is steeper than the initial trace of a ski jump. Because of this extreme inclination, the slope can only be maintained with a special secured slope unit.
