= Tesetaxel =

Chemical compound

Clinical data
- ATC code: none

Legal status
- Legal status: Investigational

Identifiers
- IUPAC name: (2aS,2bR,3S,4S,6S,8aR,10S,11aS,11bR,13aR)-2a-(acetyloxy)-6-{[(2R,3S)-3-[(tert-butoxycarbonyl)amino]-3-(3-fluoropyridin-2-yl)-2-hydroxypropanoyl]oxy}-10-[(dimethylamino)methyl]-4-hydroxy-7,11b,14,14-tetramethyl-2a,2b,3,4,5,6,8a,11a,11b,12,13,13a-dodecahydro-2H-4,8-methano[1,3]dioxolo[3,4]cyclodeca[1,2-d][1]benzoxet-3-yl benzoate
- CAS Number: 333754-36-2
- PubChem CID: 6918574
- ChemSpider: 5293771
- UNII: UG97LO5M8Y
- CompTox Dashboard (EPA): DTXSID00870326

Chemical and physical data
- Formula: C_{46}H_{60}FN_{3}O_{13}
- Molar mass: 881.992 g·mol^{−1}
- 3D model (JSmol): Interactive image
- SMILES: CC1=C2[C@@H]3[C@H]([C@@]4(CC[C@@H]5[C@]([C@H]4[C@@H]([C@@](C2(C)C)(C[C@@H]1OC(=O)[C@@H]([C@H](C6=C(C=CC=N6)F)NC(=O)OC(C)(C)C)O)O)OC(=O)C7=CC=CC=C7)(CO5)OC(=O)C)C)O[C@@H](O3)CN(C)C
- InChI: InChI=1S/C46H60FN3O13/c1-24-28(58-40(54)34(52)33(32-27(47)17-14-20-48-32)49-41(55)63-42(3,4)5)21-46(56)38(61-39(53)26-15-12-11-13-16-26)36-44(8,19-18-29-45(36,23-57-29)62-25(2)51)37-35(31(24)43(46,6)7)59-30(60-37)22-50(9)10/h11-17,20,28-30,33-38,52,56H,18-19,21-23H2,1-10H3,(H,49,55)/t28-,29+,30+,33-,34+,35+,36-,37+,38-,44+,45-,46+/m0/s1; Key:MODVSQKJJIBWPZ-VLLPJHQWSA-N

Tesetaxel is an orally administered taxane being investigated as a chemotherapy agent for various types of cancer, including breast cancer, gastric cancer, colorectal cancer, and other solid tumors. It differs from other members of the taxane class (e.g. paclitaxel or docetaxel) in that it is administered orally, not intravenously.
