= BCL2L11 =

Protein-coding gene in humans

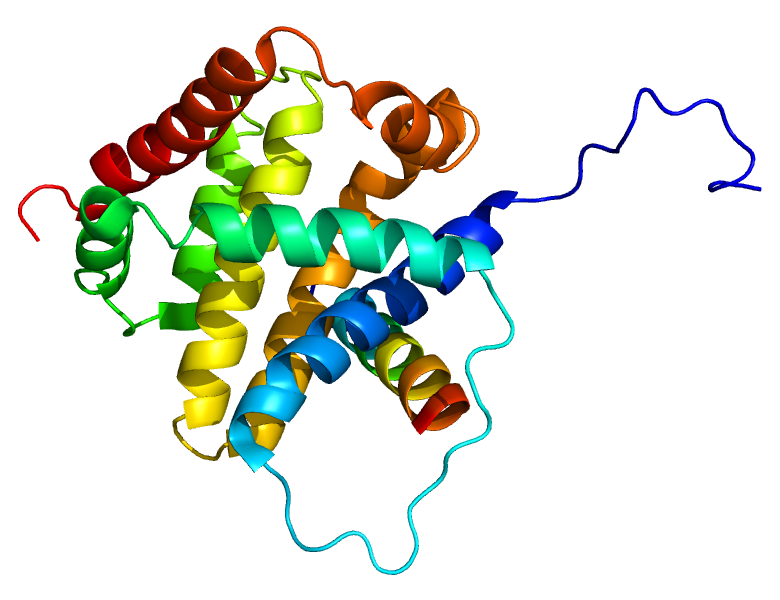

Identifiers
- Aliases: BCL2L11, BAM, BIM, BOD, BCL2 like 11
- External IDs: OMIM: 603827; MGI: 1197519; GeneCards: BCL2L11
Available structures
PDB	Ortholog search: PDBe RCSB
PDB	List of PDB id codes 1F95, 2K7W, 2NL9, 2V6Q, 2VM6, 2WH6, 2YQ6, 2YQ7, 3D7V, 3FDL, 3IO8, 3IO9, 3KJ0, 3KJ1, 3KJ2, 4A1U, 4A1W, 4B4S, 4D2M, 4QVF, 4UF3, 4YJ4, 4ZIF, 4ZIH, 5AGW, 5AGX, 5C3G

Gene location (Human)
Chr.	Chromosome 2 (human)
Band	2q13	Start	111,119,378 bp
Band	2q13	End	111,168,445 bp

Gene location (Mouse)
Chr.	Chromosome 2 (mouse)
Band	2|2 F1	Start	127,967,958 bp
Band	2|2 F1	End	128,004,467 bp
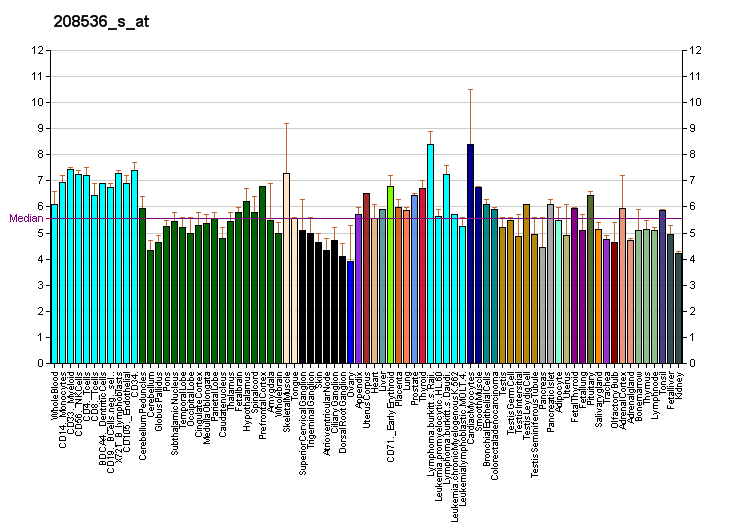

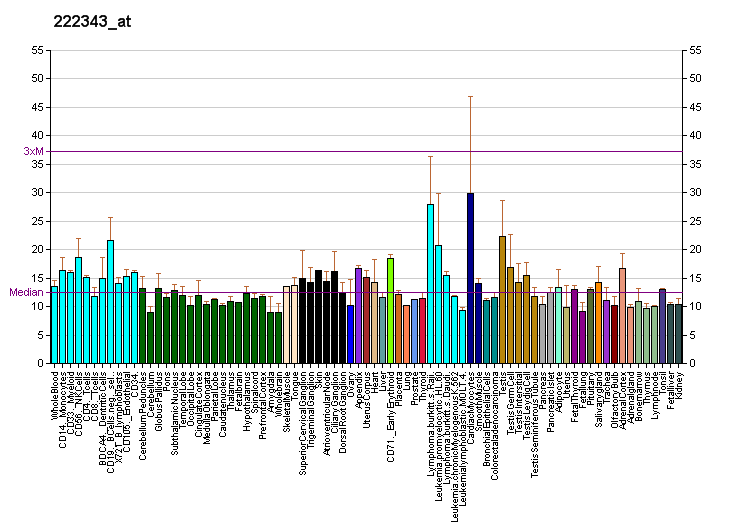
RNA expression pattern
Bgee	Human / Mouse (ortholog); Top expressed in: sperm; palpebral conjunctiva; epithelium of nasopharynx; mucosa of paranasal sinus; superficial temporal artery; gingival epithelium; monocyte; mucosa of colon; mucosa of sigmoid colon; jejunal mucosa / Top expressed in: transitional epithelium of urinary bladder; vestibular membrane of cochlear duct; ciliary body; internal carotid artery; retinal pigment epithelium; utricle; Rostral migratory stream; external carotid artery; blood; endothelial cell of lymphatic vessel; More reference expression data
BioGPS	More reference expression data
Gene ontology
Molecular function	protein binding; microtubule binding; dynein complex binding; protein heterodimerization activity; protein kinase binding
Cellular component	cytoplasm; cytosol; membrane; intracellular membrane-bounded organelle; BIM-BCL-2 complex; mitochondrial outer membrane; BIM-BCL-xl complex; cytoplasmic dynein complex; mitochondrion; microtubule; endomembrane system; extrinsic component of membrane; Bcl-2 family protein complex
Biological process	leukocyte homeostasis; regulation of apoptotic process; positive regulation of protein homooligomerization; male gonad development; positive regulation of cell death; positive regulation of endoplasmic reticulum stress-induced intrinsic apoptotic signaling pathway; B cell apoptotic process; kidney development; thymus development; lymphocyte homeostasis; positive regulation of apoptotic process by virus; myeloid cell homeostasis; post-embryonic animal organ morphogenesis; ear development; in utero embryonic development; B cell homeostasis; spleen development; thymocyte apoptotic process; post-embryonic development; response to endoplasmic reticulum stress; mammary gland development; T cell homeostasis; odontogenesis of dentin-containing tooth; positive regulation of IRE1-mediated unfolded protein response; positive regulation of cysteine-type endopeptidase activity involved in apoptotic process; tube formation; brain development; positive regulation of neuron apoptotic process; positive regulation of protein insertion into mitochondrial membrane involved in apoptotic signaling pathway; positive regulation of cell cycle; positive regulation of mitochondrial membrane permeability involved in apoptotic process; meiosis I; spermatogenesis; intrinsic apoptotic signaling pathway in response to DNA damage; extrinsic apoptotic signaling pathway in absence of ligand; positive regulation of apoptotic process; positive regulation of fibroblast apoptotic process; developmental pigmentation; positive regulation of release of cytochrome c from mitochondria; regulation of developmental pigmentation; cell-matrix adhesion; regulation of organ growth; activation of cysteine-type endopeptidase activity involved in apoptotic process; positive regulation of intrinsic apoptotic signaling pathway; apoptotic process involved in embryonic digit morphogenesis; apoptotic process; protein insertion into mitochondrial membrane involved in apoptotic signaling pathway; positive regulation of autophagy in response to ER overload; cellular response to glucocorticoid stimulus; cellular response to estradiol stimulus; cellular response to amyloid-beta
Sources:Amigo / QuickGO
Orthologs
Databases	NCBI: entry; OMA: entry
Species	Human	Mouse
Entrez	10018	12125
Ensembl	ENSG00000153094	ENSMUSG00000027381
UniProt	O43521	O54918
RefSeq (mRNA)	NM_001204106; NM_001204107; NM_001204108; NM_001204109; NM_001204110 NM_001204111; NM_001204112; NM_001204113; NM_006538; NM_138621; NM_138622; NM_138623; NM_138624; NM_138625; NM_138626; NM_138627; NM_207002; NM_207003	NM_001284410; NM_001291016; NM_009754; NM_207680; NM_207681
RefSeq (protein)	NP_001191035; NP_001191036; NP_001191037; NP_001191038; NP_001191039 NP_001191040; NP_001191041; NP_001191042; NP_006529; NP_619527; NP_619528; NP_619529; NP_619530; NP_619531; NP_619532; NP_619533; NP_996885; NP_996886	NP_001271339; NP_001277945; NP_033884; NP_997563; NP_997564 NP_001392986; NP_001392987; NP_001392988; NP_001392989; NP_001392990
Location (UCSC)	Chr 2: 111.12 – 111.17 Mb	Chr 2: 127.97 – 128 Mb
PubMed search
- Wikidata
View/Edit Human	View/Edit Mouse

Bcl-2-like protein 11, commonly called BIM (Bcl-2 Interacting Mediator of cell death), is a protein that in humans is encoded by the BCL2L11 gene.

== Function ==
The protein encoded by this gene belongs to the Bcl-2 protein family. BCL-2 family members form hetero- or homodimers and act as anti- or pro-apoptotic regulators that are involved in a wide variety of cellular activities. The protein encoded by this gene contains a Bcl-2 homology domain 3 (BH3). It has been shown to interact with other members of the BCL-2 protein family, including BCL2, BCL2L1/BCL-X(L), and MCL1, and to act as an apoptotic activator. The expression of this gene can be induced by nerve growth factor (NGF), as well as by the forkhead transcription factor FKHR-L1 (FoxO3a), which suggests a role of this gene in neuronal and lymphocyte apoptosis. Transgenic studies of the mouse counterpart suggested that this gene functions as an essential initiator of apoptosis in thymocyte-negative selection. Several alternatively spliced transcript variants of this gene have been identified.

=== Regulation of bim ===
Bim expression and activity are regulated at the transcriptional, translational and post-translational levels; coordinated expression and activity of Bim shape immune responses, and ensure tissue integrity. Cancer cells develop mechanisms that suppress Bim expression, which allows for tumor progression and metastasis.

== Interactions ==
BCL2L11 has been shown to interact with:

- BCL2-like 1,
- BCL2L2,
- Bcl-2,
- DYNLL1, and
- MCL1.

== See also ==
- Bcl-2
