= HRK (gene) =

Identifiers
- Aliases: HRK, DP5, HARAKIRI, harakiri, BCL2 interacting protein
- External IDs: OMIM: 603447; MGI: 1201608; GeneCards: HRK
Available structures
PDB	Ortholog search: PDBe RCSB
PDB	List of PDB id codes 2L58, 2L5B

Gene location (Human)
Chr.	Chromosome 12 (human)
Band	12q24.22	Start	116,856,144 bp
Band	12q24.22	End	116,881,441 bp

Gene location (Mouse)
Chr.	Chromosome 5 (mouse)
Band	5|5 F	Start	118,302,713 bp
Band	5|5 F	End	118,327,543 bp
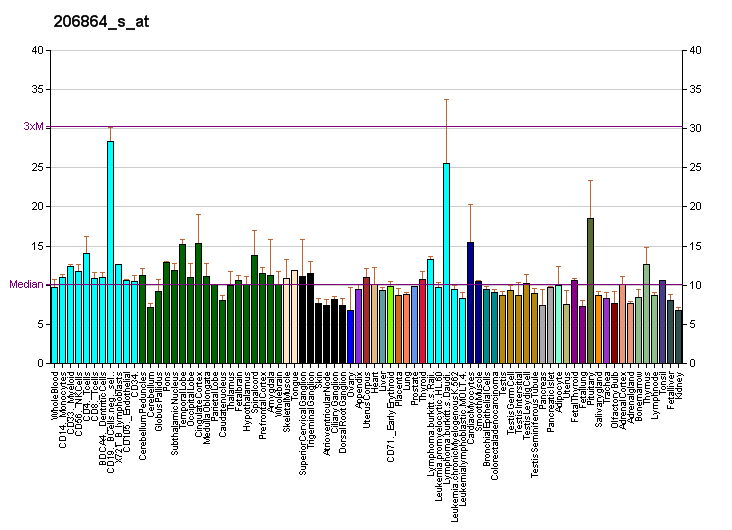

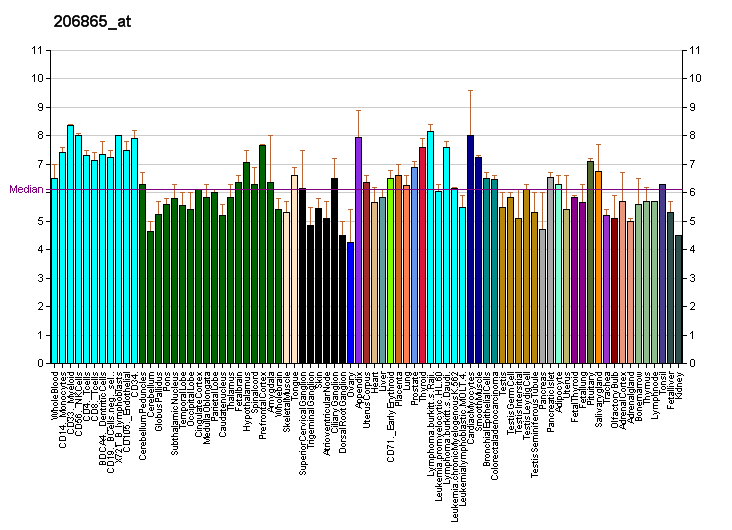
RNA expression pattern
Bgee	Human / Mouse (ortholog); Top expressed in: buccal mucosa cell; endothelial cell; pancreatic ductal cell; gonad; testicle; Brodmann area 23; hippocampus proper; prefrontal cortex; cingulate gyrus; anterior cingulate cortex / Top expressed in: dentate gyrus of hippocampal formation granule cell; superior frontal gyrus; Rostral migratory stream; trigeminal ganglion; striatum of neuraxis; primary visual cortex; temporal lobe; nucleus accumbens; Region I of hippocampus proper; dorsal striatum; More reference expression data
BioGPS	More reference expression data
Gene ontology
Molecular function	protein binding
Cellular component	integral component of membrane; membrane; mitochondrion
Biological process	regulation of apoptotic process; positive regulation of protein homooligomerization; positive regulation of release of cytochrome c from mitochondria; positive regulation of apoptotic process; apoptotic process
Sources:Amigo / QuickGO
Orthologs
Databases	NCBI: entry; OMA: entry
Species	Human	Mouse
Entrez	8739	12123
Ensembl	ENSG00000135116	ENSMUSG00000046607
UniProt	O00198	P62816
RefSeq (mRNA)	NM_003806	NM_007545
RefSeq (protein)	NP_003797	NP_031571
Location (UCSC)	Chr 12: 116.86 – 116.88 Mb	Chr 5: 118.3 – 118.33 Mb
PubMed search
- Wikidata
View/Edit Human	View/Edit Mouse

Activator of apoptosis harakiri is a protein that in humans is encoded by the HRK gene.

== Function ==
Activator of apoptosis Hrk regulates apoptosis through interaction with death-repressor proteins Bcl-2 and Bcl-X(L). The HRK protein lacks significant homology to other BCL2 family members except for an 8-amino acid region that was similar to the BCL2 homology domain-3 (BH3) motif of BIK. HRK interacts with BCL2 and BCLXL via the BH3 domain, but not with the death-promoting BCL2-related proteins BAX, BAK, or BCLXS. HRK localizes to membranes of intracellular organelles in a pattern similar to that previously reported for BCL2 and BCLXL.

== Interactions ==
HRK (gene) has been shown to interact with:

- BCL2-like 1, and
- Bcl-2.
