= Bcl-2 =

Protein found in humans

BCL2
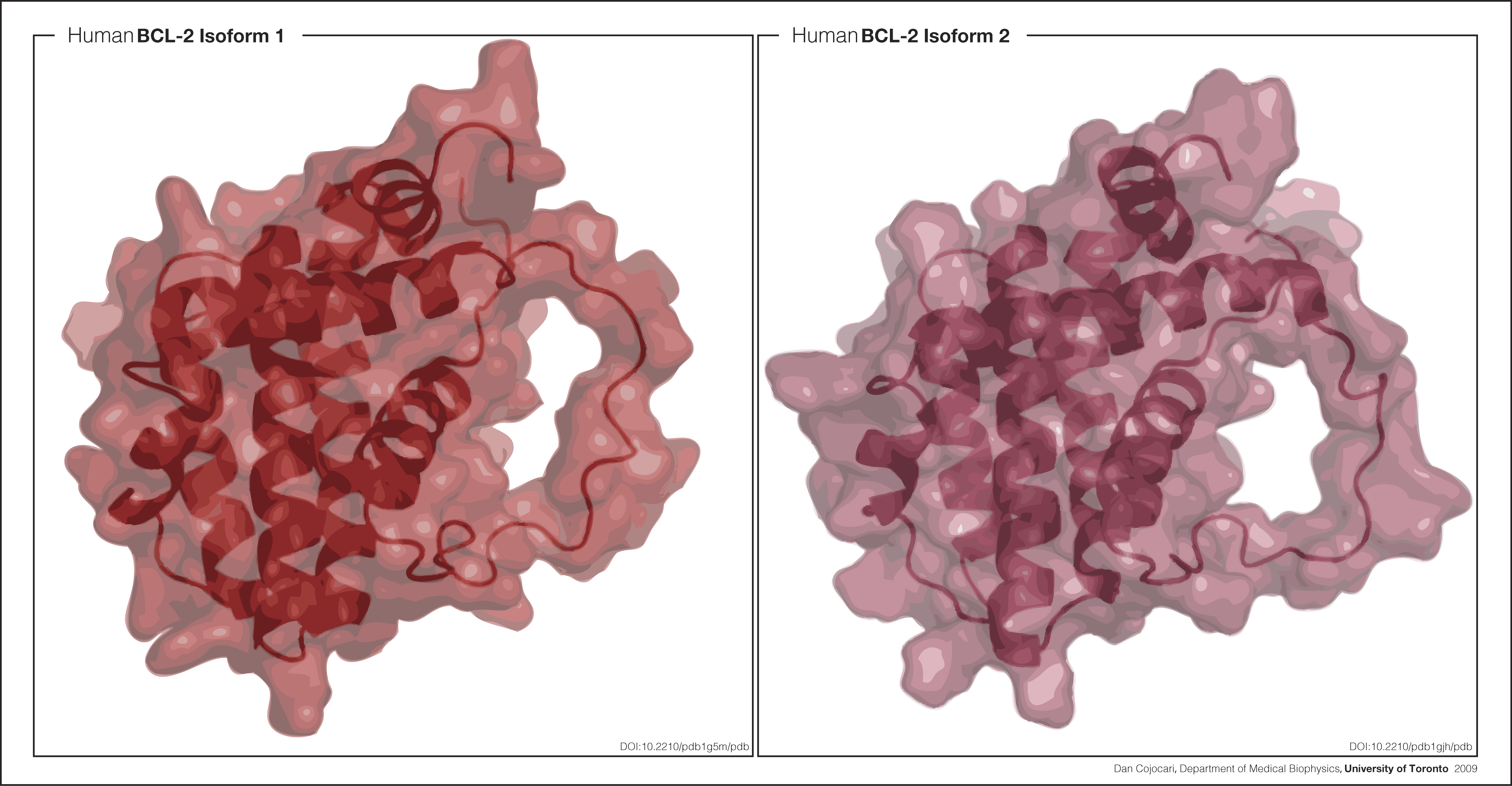

Identifiers
- Aliases: BCL2, Bcl-2, PPP1R50, B-cell CLL/lymphoma 2, apoptosis regulator, BCL2 apoptosis regulator, Genes, bcl-2
- External IDs: OMIM: 151430; MGI: 88138; GeneCards: BCL2
Available structures
PDB	Ortholog search: PDBe RCSB
PDB	List of PDB id codes 1G5M, 1GJH, 1YSW, 2O21, 2O22, 2O2F, 2W3L, 2XA0, 4AQ3, 4IEH, 4LVT, 4LXD, 4MAN, 5AGW, 5AGX, 5FCG

Gene location (Human)
Chr.	Chromosome 18 (human)
Band	18q21.33	Start	63,123,346 bp
Band	18q21.33	End	63,320,128 bp

Gene location (Mouse)
Chr.	Chromosome 1 (mouse)
Band	1 E2.1|1 49.76 cM	Start	106,465,908 bp
Band	1 E2.1|1 49.76 cM	End	106,642,004 bp
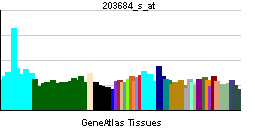

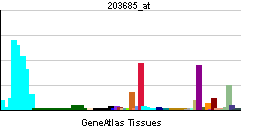

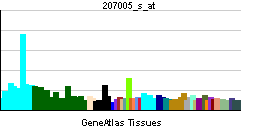
RNA expression pattern
Bgee	Human / Mouse (ortholog); Top expressed in: dorsal motor nucleus of vagus nerve; superficial temporal artery; Achilles tendon; epithelium of colon; inferior olivary nucleus; optic nerve; trigeminal ganglion; internal globus pallidus; external globus pallidus; caput epididymis / Top expressed in: ascending aorta; aortic valve; Rostral migratory stream; vestibular membrane of cochlear duct; iris; lumbar spinal ganglion; mesenteric lymph nodes; ciliary body; blood; vas deferens; More reference expression data
BioGPS	More reference expression data
Gene ontology
Molecular function	protein phosphatase binding; transcription factor binding; protein phosphatase 2A binding; channel inhibitor activity; protein homodimerization activity; channel activity; protease binding; protein binding; sequence-specific DNA binding; BH3 domain binding; identical protein binding; protein heterodimerization activity; ubiquitin protein ligase binding
Cellular component	cytoplasm; cytosol; nuclear membrane; membrane; mitochondrion; nucleus; mitochondrial membranes; myelin sheath; mitochondrial outer membrane; endoplasmic reticulum; pore complex; integral component of membrane; intracellular anatomical structure; endoplasmic reticulum membrane; nucleoplasm; protein-containing complex
Biological process	negative regulation of neuron apoptotic process; intrinsic apoptotic signaling pathway in response to oxidative stress; ureteric bud development; renal system process; organ growth; T cell differentiation in thymus; lymphocyte homeostasis; response to steroid hormone; positive regulation of catalytic activity; ear development; glomerulus development; post-embryonic development; cellular response to DNA damage stimulus; T cell homeostasis; negative regulation of ossification; negative regulation of G1/S transition of mitotic cell cycle; positive regulation of smooth muscle cell migration; regulation of protein localization; T cell differentiation; B cell lineage commitment; response to ischemia; regulation of mitochondrial membrane permeability; humoral immune response; defense response to virus; mesenchymal cell development; positive regulation of multicellular organism growth; animal organ morphogenesis; developmental pigmentation; hair follicle morphogenesis; B cell differentiation; cell population proliferation; metanephros development; melanocyte differentiation; negative regulation of autophagy; positive regulation of neuron maturation; negative regulation of myeloid cell apoptotic process; cellular response to hypoxia; pigment granule organization; negative regulation of cell population proliferation; B cell receptor signaling pathway; cellular response to organic substance; regulation of apoptotic process; response to cytokine; cellular response to glucose starvation; regulation of protein stability; ossification; positive regulation of melanocyte differentiation; axon regeneration; kidney development; actin filament organization; thymus development; negative regulation of intrinsic apoptotic signaling pathway; negative regulation of apoptotic signaling pathway; response to nicotine; spleen development; endoplasmic reticulum calcium ion homeostasis; positive regulation of skeletal muscle fiber development; response to oxidative stress; lymphoid progenitor cell differentiation; positive regulation of peptidyl-serine phosphorylation; CD8-positive, alpha-beta T cell lineage commitment; reactive oxygen species metabolic process; negative regulation of retinal cell programmed cell death; branching involved in ureteric bud morphogenesis; gland morphogenesis; positive regulation of cell growth; positive regulation of B cell proliferation; negative regulation of cell growth; response to gamma radiation; positive regulation of intrinsic apoptotic signaling pathway; response to toxic substance; digestive tract morphogenesis; neuron apoptotic process; male gonad development; regulation of protein heterodimerization activity; regulation of glycoprotein biosynthetic process; regulation of viral genome replication; female pregnancy; negative regulation of mitochondrial depolarization; protein dephosphorylation; protein polyubiquitination; cellular calcium ion homeostasis; B cell homeostasis; behavioral fear response; oocyte development; regulation of cell-matrix adhesion; response to iron ion; negative regulation of cell migration; regulation of autophagy; positive regulation of developmental pigmentation; developmental growth; regulation of transmembrane transporter activity; ovarian follicle development; regulation of gene expression; negative regulation of calcium ion transport into cytosol; negative regulation of osteoblast proliferation; homeostasis of number of cells within a tissue; pigmentation; response to radiation; regulation of catalytic activity; peptidyl-threonine phosphorylation; regulation of protein homodimerization activity; negative regulation of anoikis; response to hydrogen peroxide; T cell lineage commitment; cochlear nucleus development; leukocyte homeostasis; regulation of programmed cell death; regulation of calcium ion transport; axonogenesis; negative regulation of cellular pH reduction; response to glucocorticoid; regulation of cell cycle; regulation of mitochondrial membrane potential; melanin metabolic process; focal adhesion assembly; positive regulation of protein insertion into mitochondrial membrane involved in apoptotic signaling pathway; B cell proliferation; intrinsic apoptotic signaling pathway in response to endoplasmic reticulum stress; immune system development; apoptotic mitochondrial changes; peptidyl-serine phosphorylation; regulation of nitrogen utilization; cell morphogenesis; positive regulation of cell population proliferation; negative regulation of reactive oxygen species metabolic process; response to UV-B; regulation of developmental pigmentation; negative regulation of extrinsic apoptotic signaling pathway in absence of ligand; extrinsic apoptotic signaling pathway via death domain receptors; release of cytochrome c from mitochondria; negative regulation of mitotic cell cycle; extrinsic apoptotic signaling pathway in absence of ligand; apoptotic process; transmembrane transport; intrinsic apoptotic signaling pathway in response to DNA damage; growth; cell-cell adhesion; cytokine-mediated signaling pathway; negative regulation of apoptotic process; hemopoiesis; regulation of growth; negative regulation of intrinsic apoptotic signaling pathway in response to DNA damage by p53 class mediator
Sources:Amigo / QuickGO
Orthologs
Databases	NCBI: entry; OMA: entry
Species	Human	Mouse
Entrez	596	12043
Ensembl	ENSG00000171791	ENSMUSG00000057329
UniProt	P10415	P10417
RefSeq (mRNA)	NM_000633; NM_000657	NM_009741; NM_177410
RefSeq (protein)	NP_000624; NP_000648	NP_033871; NP_803129
Location (UCSC)	Chr 18: 63.12 – 63.32 Mb	Chr 1: 106.47 – 106.64 Mb
PubMed search
- Wikidata
View/Edit Human	View/Edit Mouse

Bcl-2, encoded in humans by the BCL2 gene, is the founding member of the Bcl-2 family of regulator proteins. BCL2 blocks programmed cell death (apoptosis) while other BCL2 family members can either inhibit or induce it. It was the first apoptosis regulator identified in any organism.

Bcl-2 derives its name from B-cell lymphoma 2, as it is the second member of a range of proteins initially described in chromosomal translocations involving chromosomes 14 and 18 in follicular lymphomas. Orthologs (such as Bcl2 in mice) have been identified in numerous mammals for which complete genome data are available.

Like BCL3, BCL5, BCL6, BCL7A, BCL9, and BCL10, it has clinical significance in lymphoma.

== Isoforms ==
The two isoforms of Bcl-2, Isoform 1, and Isoform 2, exhibit a similar fold. However, results in the ability of these isoforms to bind to the BAD and BAK proteins, as well as in the structural topology and electrostatic potential of the binding groove, suggest differences in antiapoptotic activity for the two isoforms.

== Function ==
BCL-2 is localized to the outer membrane of mitochondria, where it plays an important role in promoting cellular survival and inhibiting the actions of pro-apoptotic proteins. The pro-apoptotic proteins in the BCL-2 family, including Bax and Bak, normally act on the mitochondrial membrane to promote permeabilization and release of cytochrome c and ROS, that are important signals in the apoptosis cascade. These pro-apoptotic proteins are in turn activated by BH3-only proteins, and are inhibited by the function of BCL-2 and its relative BCL-Xl.

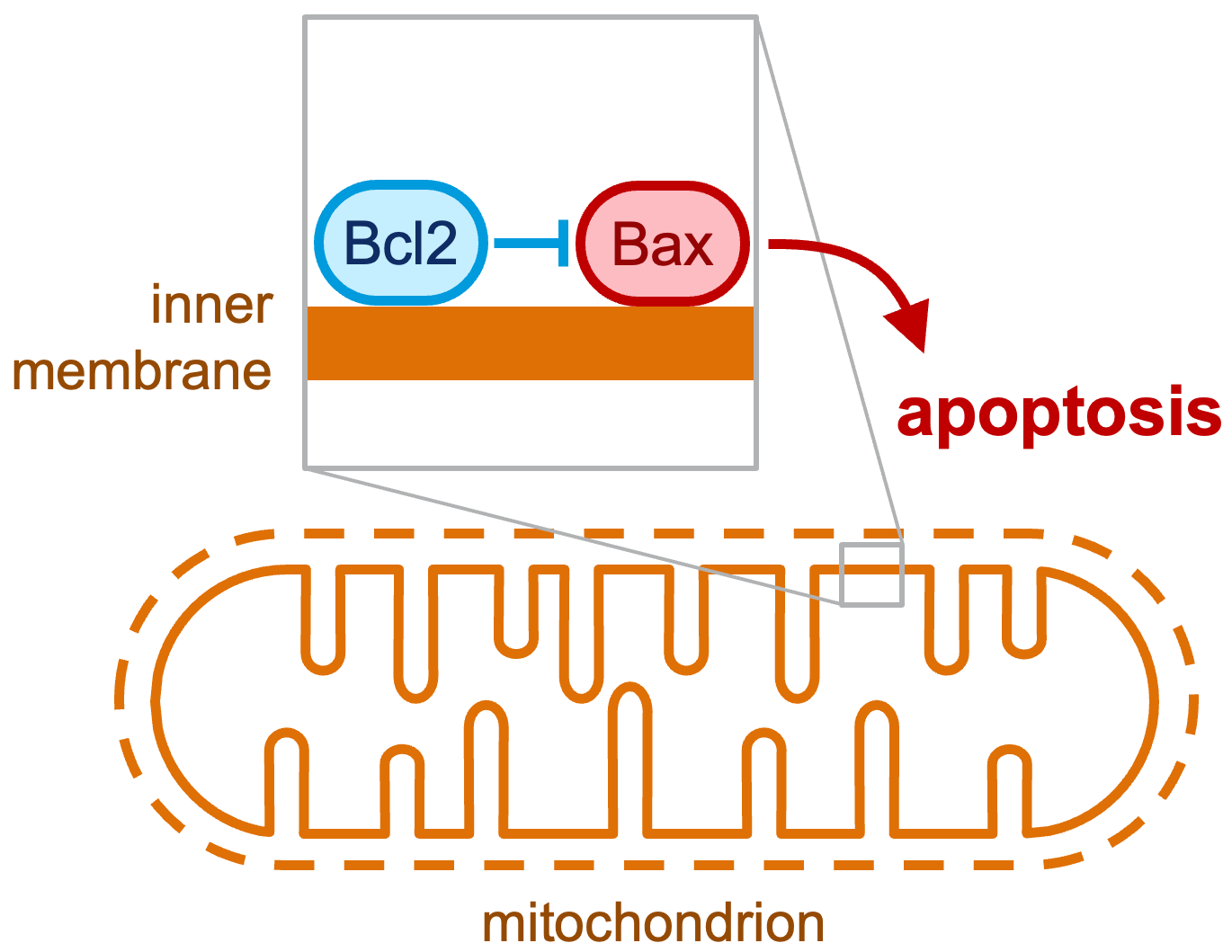

There are additional non-canonical roles of BCL-2 that are being explored. BCL-2 is known to regulate mitochondrial dynamics, and is involved in the regulation of mitochondrial fusion and fission. Additionally, in pancreatic beta-cells, BCL-2 and BCL-Xl are known to be involved in controlling metabolic activity and insulin secretion, with inhibition of BCL-2/Xl showing increasing metabolic activity, but also additional ROS production; this suggests it has a protective metabolic effect in conditions of high demand.

== Role in disease ==
Damage to the Bcl-2 gene has been identified as a cause of a number of cancers, including melanoma, breast, prostate, chronic lymphocytic leukemia, and lung cancer, and a possible cause of schizophrenia and autoimmunity. It is also a cause of resistance to cancer treatments.

=== Cancer ===
Cancer can be seen as a disturbance in the homeostatic balance between cell growth and cell death. Over-expression of anti-apoptotic genes, and under-expression of pro-apoptotic genes, can result in the lack of cell death that is characteristic of cancer. An example can be seen in lymphomas. The over-expression of the anti-apoptotic Bcl-2 protein in lymphocytes alone does not cause cancer. But simultaneous over-expression of Bcl-2 and the proto-oncogene myc may produce aggressive B-cell malignancies including lymphoma. In follicular lymphoma, a chromosomal translocation commonly occurs between the fourteenth and the eighteenth chromosomes – t(14;18) – which places the Bcl-2 gene from chromosome 18 next to the immunoglobulin heavy chain locus on chromosome 14. This fusion gene is deregulated, leading to the transcription of excessively high levels of Bcl-2. This decreases the propensity of these cells for apoptosis. Bcl-2 expression is frequent in small cell lung cancer, accounting for 76% cases in one study.

=== Auto-immune diseases ===
Apoptosis plays an active role in regulating the immune system. When it is functional, it can cause immune unresponsiveness to self-antigens via both central and peripheral tolerance. In the case of defective apoptosis, it may contribute to etiological aspects of autoimmune diseases. The autoimmune disease type 1 diabetes can be caused by defective apoptosis, which leads to aberrant T cell AICD and defective peripheral tolerance. Due to the fact that dendritic cells are the immune system's most important antigen-presenting cells, their activity must be tightly regulated by mechanisms such as apoptosis. Researchers have found that mice containing dendritic cells that are Bim -/-, thus unable to induce effective apoptosis, have autoimmune diseases more so than those that have normal dendritic cells. Other studies have shown that dendritic cell lifespan may be partly controlled by a timer dependent on anti-apoptotic Bcl-2.

=== Other ===
Apoptosis plays an important role in regulating a variety of diseases. For example, schizophrenia is a psychiatric disorder in which an abnormal ratio of pro- and anti-apoptotic factors may contribute towards pathogenesis. Some evidence suggests that this may result from abnormal expression of Bcl-2 and increased expression of caspase-3.

== Diagnostic use ==
Antibodies to Bcl-2 can be used with immunohistochemistry to identify cells containing the antigen. In healthy tissue, these antibodies react with B-cells in the mantle zone, as well as some T-cells. However, positive cells increase considerably in follicular lymphoma, as well as many other forms of cancer. In some cases, the presence or absence of Bcl-2 staining in biopsies may be significant for the patient's prognosis or likelihood of relapse.

== Targeted therapies ==
Targeted and selective Bcl-2 inhibitors that have been in development or are currently in the clinic include:

=== Oblimersen ===
An antisense oligonucleotide drug, oblimersen (G3139), was developed by Genta Incorporated to target Bcl-2. An antisense DNA or RNA strand is non-coding and complementary to the coding strand (which is the template for producing respectively RNA or protein). An antisense drug is a short sequence of modified DNA that hybridises with and inactivates mRNA, preventing the protein from being formed.

Human lymphoma cell proliferation (with t(14;18) translocation) could be inhibited by antisense oligonucleotide targeted at the start codon region of Bcl-2 mRNA. In vitro studies led to the identification of Genasense, which is complementary to the first 6 codons of Bcl-2 mRNA.

These showed successful results in Phase I/II trials for lymphoma. A large Phase III trial was launched in 2004. As of 2016, the drug had not been approved and its developer was out of business.

=== ABT-737 and navitoclax (ABT-263) ===
In the mid-2000s, Abbott Laboratories developed a novel inhibitor of Bcl-2, Bcl-xL and Bcl-w, known as ABT-737. This compound is part of a group of BH3 mimetic small molecule inhibitors (SMI) that target these Bcl-2 family proteins, but not A1 or Mcl-1. ABT-737 is superior to previous BCL-2 inhibitors given its higher affinity for Bcl-2, Bcl-xL and Bcl-w. In vitro studies showed that primary cells from patients with B-cell malignancies are sensitive to ABT-737.

In animal models, it improves survival, causes tumor regression and cures a high percentage of mice. In preclinical studies utilizing patient xenografts, ABT-737 showed efficacy for treating lymphoma and other blood cancers. Because of its unfavorable pharmacologic properties ABT-737 is not appropriate for clinical trials, while its orally bioavailable derivative navitoclax (ABT-263) has similar activity on small cell lung cancer (SCLC) cell lines and has entered clinical trials. While clinical responses with navitoclax were promising, mechanistic dose-limiting thrombocytopenia was observed in patients under treatment due to Bcl-xL inhibition in platelets.

=== Venetoclax (ABT-199) ===
Due to dose-limiting thrombocytopenia of navitoclax as a result of Bcl-xL inhibition, Abbvie successfully developed the highly selective inhibitor venetoclax (ABT-199), which inhibits Bcl-2, but not Bcl-xL or Bcl-w. Clinical trials studied the effects of venetoclax, a BH3-mimetic drug designed to block the function of the Bcl-2 protein, on patients with chronic lymphocytic leukemia (CLL). Good responses have been reported and thrombocytopenia was no longer observed. A phase 3 trial started in Dec 2015. It was approved by the US FDA in April 2016 as a second-line treatment for CLL associated with 17-p deletion. This was the first FDA approval of a BCL-2 inhibitor. In June 2018, the FDA broadened the approval for anyone with CLL or small lymphocytic lymphoma, with or without 17p deletion, still as a second-line treatment.

=== Sonrotoclax (BGB-11417) ===
Venetoclax drug resistance has been noted with the G101V mutation in BCL-2 observed in relapsing patients. Sonrotoclax shows greater tumor growth inhibition in hematologic tumor models than venetoclax and inhibits venetoclax-resistant BCL-2 variants. Sonrotoclax is under clinical investigation as a monotherapy and in combination with other anticancer agents.

=== Lisaftoclax (APG-2575) ===
Lisaftoclax is being developed by Ascentage Pharma.

=== Lonitoclax (ZE50-0134) ===
Lonitoclax is being developed by Lomond Therapeutics.

== Interactions ==
Overview of signal transduction pathways involved in apoptosis

Bcl-2 has been shown to interact with:

- BAK1,
- BCAP31,
- BCL2-like 1,
- BCL2L11,
- BECN1,
- BID,
- BMF,
- BNIP2,
- BNIP3,
- BNIPL,
- BAD
- BAX,
- BIK,
- C-Raf,
- CAPN2,
- CASP8,
- Cdk1,
- HRK,
- IRS1,
- Myc,
- NR4A1,
- Noxa,
- PPP2CA,
- PSEN1,
- RAD9A,
- RRAS,
- RTN4,
- SMN1,
- SOD1, and
- TP53BP2.

== See also ==
- Apoptosome
- Bcl-2 homologous antagonist killer (BAK)
- Bcl-2-associated X protein (BAX)
- BH3 interacting domain death agonist (BID)
- Caspases
- Noxa
- Microphthalmia-associated transcription factor
- Protein mimetic
- p53 upregulated modulator of apoptosis (PUMA)
- Senolytics
