= PANO1 =

Mammalian protein found in Homo sapiens

Identifiers
- Aliases: PANO1, PANO, proapoptotic nucleolar protein 1
- External IDs: GeneCards: PANO1; OMA:PANO1 - orthologs

Gene location (Human)
Chr.	Chromosome 11 (human)
Band	11p15.5	Start	797,511 bp
Band	11p15.5	End	799,190 bp
RNA expression pattern
Bgee	Human / Mouse (ortholog); Top expressed in: testicle; right hemisphere of cerebellum; stromal cell of endometrium; pituitary gland; body of pancreas; anterior pituitary; right lobe of liver; granulocyte; primary visual cortex; superior frontal gyrus / n/a; More reference expression data
BioGPS	n/a
Orthologs
Species	Human	Mouse
Entrez	101927423	n/a
Ensembl	ENSG00000288675	n/a
UniProt	I0J062	n/a
RefSeq (mRNA)	NM_001293167	n/a
RefSeq (protein)	NP_001280096	n/a
Location (UCSC)	Chr 11: 0.8 – 0.8 Mb	n/a
PubMed search		n/a
- Wikidata
View/Edit Human

PANO1 is a protein which in humans is encoded by the PANO1 gene. PANO1 is an apoptosis inducing protein that is able to regulate the function of tumor suppressor. More specifically, P14ARF is a protein in which in humans is modulated by the PANO1 gene. P14ARF is known to function as a tumor suppressor. When PANO1 is highly expressed in the cells, it is able to modulate p14ARF by stabilizing it and protecting it from degradation. With a confidence level of 5 out of 5, PANO1 has been theorized to be expressed in the nucleolus of the cell. PANO1 is an intron-less gene. Intron-less genes only make up about 3% of the human genome. A functional analysis of these types of genes revealed that they often have tissue-specific expression in tissues such as the nervous system and testis. This kind of expression is commonly associated with neuropathies, disease, and cancer. The tissue types that PANO1 has the highest expression in, are the cerebellum regions of the brain as well as pituitary and testis tissues.

== Gene ==
PANO1 is also known as Proapoptotic Nucleolar Protein 1, PANO, and Pre-mRNA-splicing Factor CW22-like. PANO1 is located on human chromosome 11 at positions 797,511-799,190 and is positioned on the + strand. Its protein contains 1 exon and 215 amino acids.

== Transcripts and proteins ==
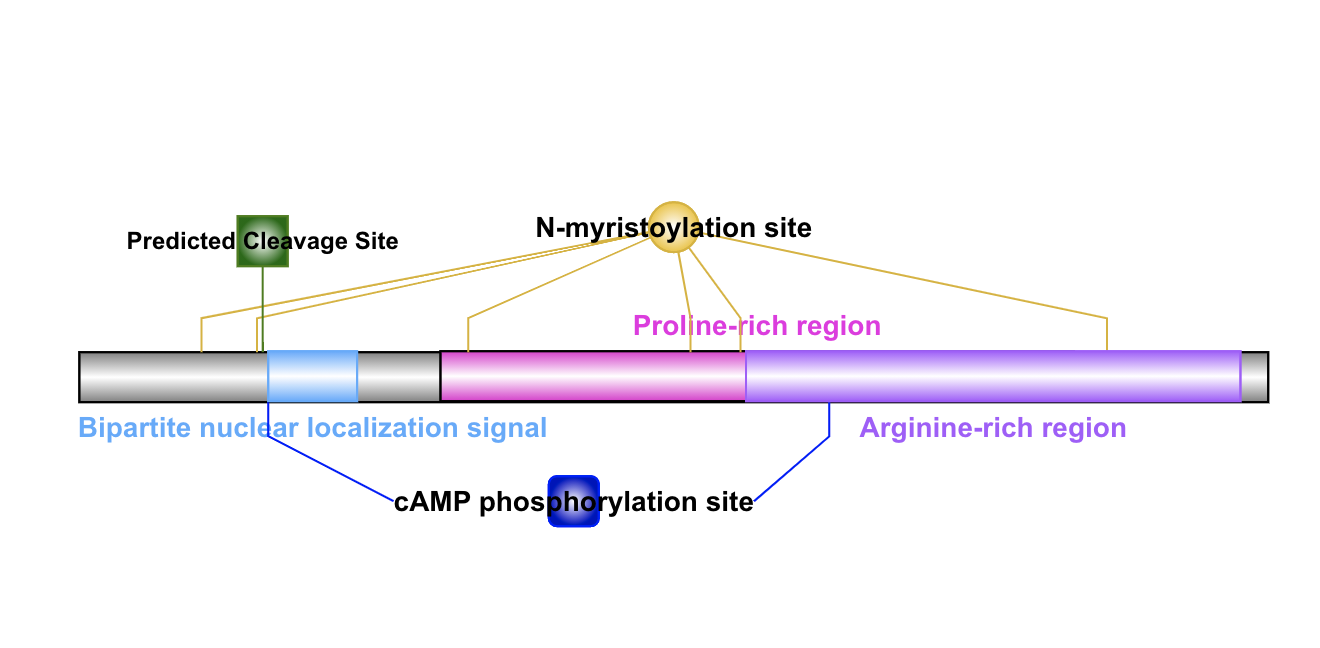
PANO1 protein model with motifs generated through IBS tool at Cuckoo Workgroup

PANO1 has one isoform, isoform 1, located in the PONAB and PANTR species. These isoforms have proteins with 215 and 216 amino acids, respectively. No isoforms for the human PANO1 protein could be identified. Human PANO1 protein has a molecular weight of 22.8 kb and a theoretical, isoelectric point of 12.21. From an analysis of the PANO1 protein, it was observed that the protein contains a low amount of lysine and a very low amount of asparagine when compared to other human proteins. The same analysis indicated that the protein does not contain any hydrophobic or transmembrane regions. PANO1 contains 2 cAMP phosphorylation sites, 6 N-myristoylation sites, 4 protein kinase C phosphorylation sites, 3 bipartite nuclear localization signals as well as arginine-rich and proline-rich regions. Using PSORTII, 3 discrimination of nuclear localization signals were identified. Pat4 (RRRR) at position 200, Pat7 (RRRR) at position 201 and a bipartite (RKGTPTARCLGQRTKEK) at position 35. Nuclear localization signals allow proteins to be able to enter the nucleus, but many nuclear proteins possess their own. PANO1 overlaps solute carrier family 25 member 22 (SLC25A22). A causal link between this solute carrier, when upregulated, has been strongly associated with an osteosarcoma's ability to proliferate. In addition to promoting proliferation, SLC25A22 when expressed in vitro, progressed the cell cycle and inhibited apoptosis. It is curious that PANO1, an apoptosis inducer, and SLC25A22, an apoptosis inhibitor, overlap one another.

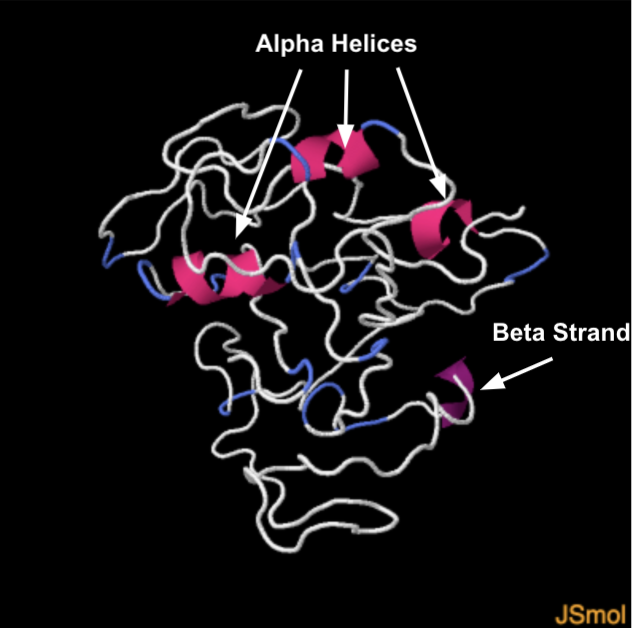
Predicted secondary structure of PANO1 protein generated from Phyre2 and annotated to show alpha helices as well as a beta strand

=== Structure ===
The structure of PANO1 is 82% disordered meaning the protein is able to move around easily. The secondary structure reveals a beta strand at positions 3-9 as well as alpha helices incorporated throughout.

== Gene level regulation ==
=== Promoter ===
One promoter region was identified using Genomatix. It is located on the positive strand and is 1040 bp in length. Its start site is located at 795633 and it ends at 796672. It overlaps with the primary transcript which starts at 796633. 440 transcription factors were identified within the promoter region. To highlight some of relevance and importance to PANO1: Wilms tumor suppressor, spermatogenic zip 1 transcription factor, signal transducer and activator of transcription, pleomorphic adenoma gene, general transcription factor IIIA, stimulating protein 1, CCAAT/enhancer binding protein, GC box elements and HMG box-containing protein 1.

=== Expression ===
Like previously mentioned, PANO1 is detected to be most expressed in the cerebellum, pituitary and testis tissues. Furthermore, NCBI Geo profiles indicated that PANO1 is highly expressed in B-lymphocytes, liposarcomas, and the testis cell lines. It also appears that PANO1 is highly expressed in the androgen-sensitive LAPC-4 cell line with a rank of 97. PANO1 is biased to being expressed in androgen sensitive cells compared to androgen insensitive cells.

== Transcript level regulation ==
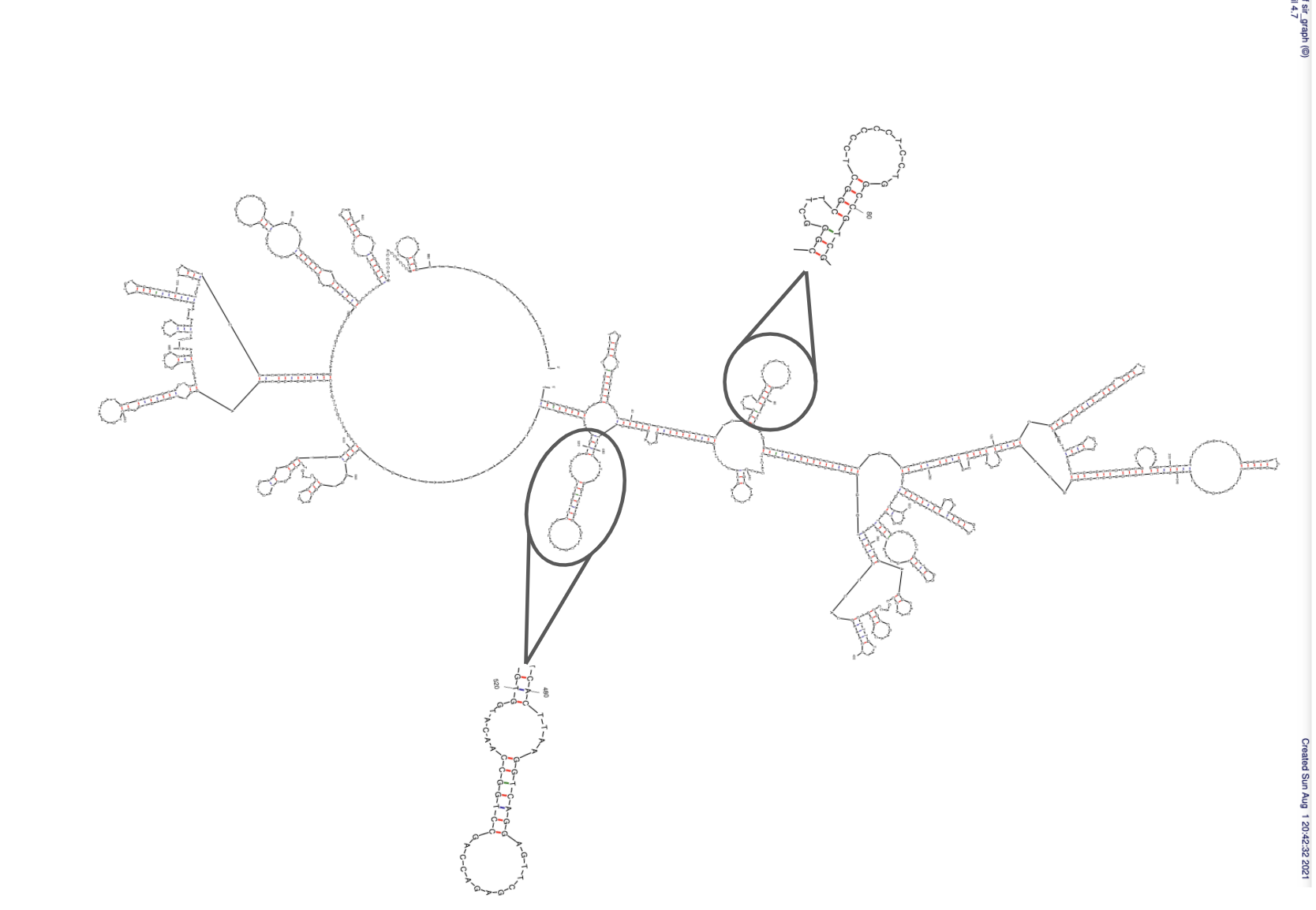
Predicted 3' UTR DNA folding structure generated from Unafold program and annotated to be able to see stem loops.

A predicted 3' UTR structure was generated using Unafold and depicts predicted stem loop structures. Two stem loop structures are zoomed in on.

== Protein level regulation ==
A possible cleavage site was identified between amino acids 33 and 34 as depicted in the PANO1 protein model. As mentioned previously, 6 N-myristoylation sites, 2 cAMP phosphorylation sites, and 4 protein kinase C phosphorylation sites are also present.

Protein motif locations
Motif	Location (aa)
N-myristoylation site	23-28
N-myristoylation site	33-38
N-myristoylation site	71-76
N-myristoylation site	111-116
N-myristoylation site	120-125
N-myristoylation site	186-191
cAMP phosphorylation site	35-38
cAMP phosphorylation site	136-139
protein kinase C phosphorylation site	34-36
protein kinase C phosphorylation site	40-42
protein kinase C phosphorylation site	57-59
protein kinase C phosphorylation site	191-193

== Homology and evolutionary history ==
=== Orthologs and phylogenic tree ===
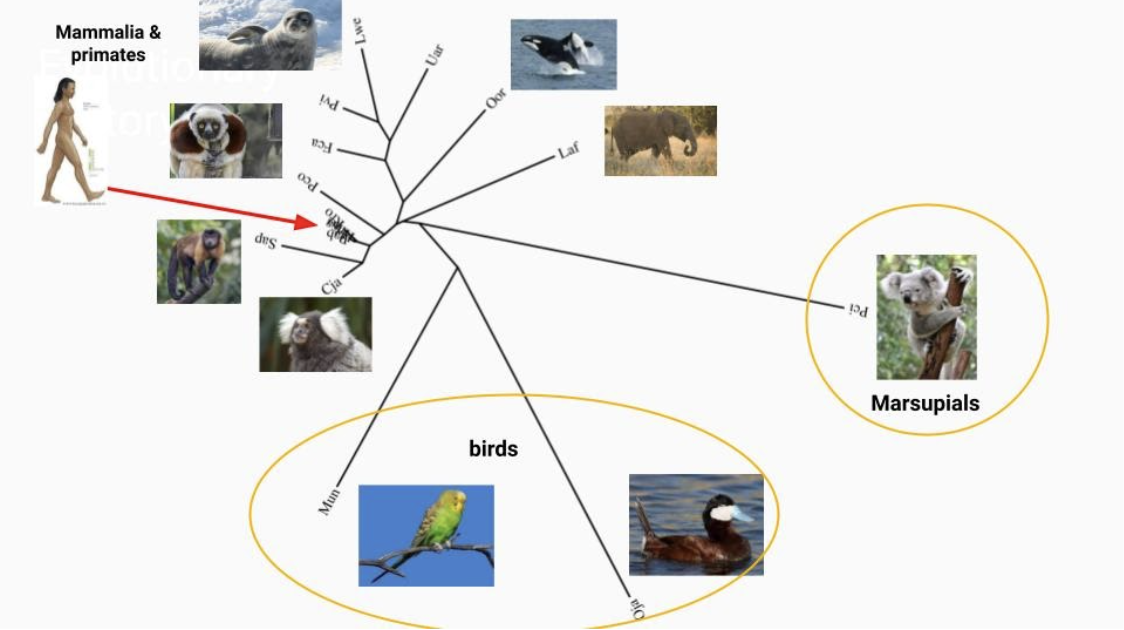
Phylogenic tree of PANO1 generated using date of divergence data.

PANO1 orthologs were only able to be traced back in divergence to birds. Much more closely related orthologs include primates, as well as marsupial and placental mammals. Specific examples of orthologs can be seen in the table below.

Genus & species	Common name	Tax. group	Date of divergence (MYA)	Accession #	Seq. length (aa)	Seq. identity to HSA prot. (%)	Seq. identity to HSA prot. (#/100)	Seq. similarity to HSA prot. (%)	n	m
Homo sapiens	Human	human	0	XP_034607700.1	215	100	1	100	0	0
Pongo abelii	Sumatran orangutan	primate	15.76	XP_024111240.1	216	96.3	0.963	100	0.037	3.770186718
Sapajus apella	tufted capuchin	primate	43.2	XP_024111240.1	216	96.3	0.963	100	0.037	3.770186718
Hylobates moloch	silvery gibbon	primate	19.8	XP_032005218.1	175	95.43	0.9543	81	0.0457	4.677719156
Rhinopithecus roxellana	golden monkey	primate	28.21	XP_030773457.1	239	86.63	0.8663	86	0.1337	14.35240101
Callithrix jacchus	white-tufted-eared marmoset	primate	42.9	XP_009007032.2	268	72.5	0.725	91	0.275	32.15836241
Propithecus coquereli	Coquerel's sifaka	primate	74.1	XP_012507388.1	183	69.28	0.6928	71	0.3072	36.70139217
Phascolarctos cinereus	koala	marsupial	160	XP_020836186.1	205	28.5	0.285		0.715	125.5266099
Leptonychotes weddellii	Weddell seal	placental	96	XP_030893169.1	182	47.88	0.4788	70	0.5212	73.64723053
Phoca vitulina	harbor seal	placental	96	XP_032270736.1	264	54.55	0.5455	67	0.4545	60.60524737
Loxodonta africana	African bush elephant	placental	105	XP_010600675.1	204	39	0.39	85	0.61	94.16085399
Orcinus orca	killer whale	placental	96	XP_012391505.1	237	41.21	0.4121	91	0.5879	88.64892406
Felis catus	house cat	placental	96	XP_023096045.1	217	59.86	0.5986		0.4014	51.31616836
Ursus arctos horribilis	grizzly bear	placental	96	XP_026346196.1	290	60.34	0.6034	53	0.3966	50.51749523
Oxyura jamaicensis	ruddy duck	bird	312	XP_035173110.1	278	29.26	0.2926		0.7074	122.894879
Melopsittacus undulatus	budgerigar	bird	312	XP_033919672.1	228	28.73	0.2873		0.7127	124.7228313

=== Divergence ===
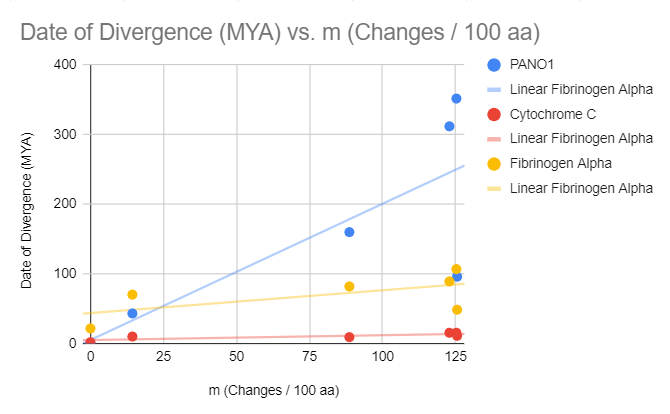
Date of divergence in millions of years vs. "m" (changes / 100 amino acids) graph comparing PANO1 to two different proteins, fibrinogen alpha as well as cytochrome c.

PANO1 was compared to two other genes, fibrinogen alpha chain as well as cytochrome C. The date of divergence as well as amino acid changes were tracked over many different species types to generate a divergence date vs. number of amino acids changes as seen to the right. PANO1 appears to diverge much more quickly than fibrinogen alpha and much more quickly than cytochrome c.

== Interacting proteins ==
p14ARF is a protein that is a known tumor suppressor. It does this by controlling cell proliferation and cell survival, however the mechanism for how this process is controlled/modulated remained unclear. PANO1 has been identified to modulate and stabilize p14ARF by stabilizing it and protecting it from degradation in HeLa cells. When PANO1 is over-expressed, as a direct result, p14ARF expression also increases.

=== Clinical significance ===
When there is an abnormal expression of PANO1 in HeLa cells, scientists have seen a decrease in tumorigenicity in nude mice. Additionally, other diseases that have been associated with PANO1 include hemochromatosis 2.
