= Zinc finger protein 280B =

Protein found in humans

ZNF280B

Identifiers
- Aliases: ZNF280B, 5'OY11.1, D87009.C22.3, SUHW2, ZNF279, ZNF632, zinc finger protein 280B
- External IDs: MGI: 1927865; GeneCards: ZNF280B

Gene location (Human)
Chr.	Chromosome 22 (human)
Band	22q11.22	Start	22,484,421 bp
Band	22q11.22	End	22,508,742 bp

Gene location (Mouse)
Chr.	Chromosome 10 (mouse)
Band	10|10 C1	Start	75,868,484 bp
Band	10|10 C1	End	75,879,068 bp
RNA expression pattern
Bgee	Human / Mouse (ortholog); Top expressed in: testicle; right testis; gonad; left testis; superior frontal gyrus; islet of Langerhans; primary visual cortex; prefrontal cortex; hypothalamus; ventricular zone / Top expressed in: zygote; secondary oocyte; primary oocyte; yolk sac; tail of embryo; cumulus cell; hand; primitive streak; genital tubercle; triceps brachii muscle; More reference expression data
BioGPS	n/a
Gene ontology
Molecular function	DNA binding; metal ion binding; nucleic acid binding; DNA-binding transcription factor activity, RNA polymerase II-specific; DNA-binding transcription factor activity
Cellular component	nucleus
Biological process	regulation of transcription, DNA-templated; transcription, DNA-templated; regulation of transcription by RNA polymerase II
Sources:Amigo / QuickGO
Orthologs
Databases	NCBI: entry; OMA: entry
Species	Human	Mouse
Entrez	140883	64453
Ensembl	ENSG00000275004; ENSG00000277421	ENSMUSG00000049764
UniProt	Q86YH2	Q505F4
RefSeq (mRNA)	NM_080764	NM_177475
RefSeq (protein)	NP_542942	NP_803426
Location (UCSC)	Chr 22: 22.48 – 22.51 Mb	Chr 10: 75.87 – 75.88 Mb
PubMed search
- Wikidata
View/Edit Human	View/Edit Mouse

Zinc finger protein 280B is a protein that in humans is encoded by the ZNF280B gene.

== Function ==
The protein encoded by this gene is a transcription factor that upregulates expression of MDM2, which negatively regulates p53 expression. This gene is highly expressed in prostate cancer cells, which leads to a reduction in p53 levels and an increase in growth of the cancer cells. Several transcript variants have been found for this gene, but only one of them is protein-coding.
