= PSME3 =

Protein found in humans

Identifiers
- Aliases: PSME3, HEL-S-283, Ki, PA28-gamma, PA28G, PA28gamma, REG-GAMMA, proteasome activator subunit 3
- External IDs: OMIM: 605129; MGI: 1096366; GeneCards: PSME3

Gene location (Human)
Chr.	Chromosome 17 (human)
Band	17q21.31	Start	42,824,385 bp
Band	17q21.31	End	42,843,760 bp

Gene location (Mouse)
Chr.	Chromosome 11 (mouse)
Band	11 D|11 64.67 cM	Start	101,207,039 bp
Band	11 D|11 64.67 cM	End	101,214,363 bp
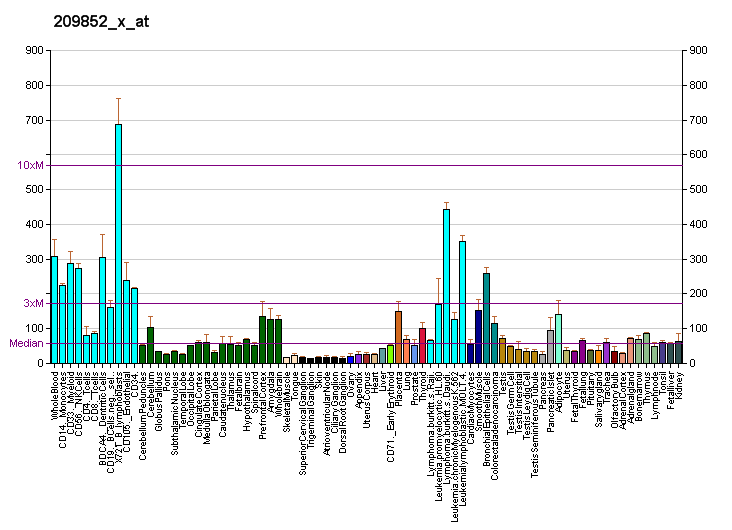

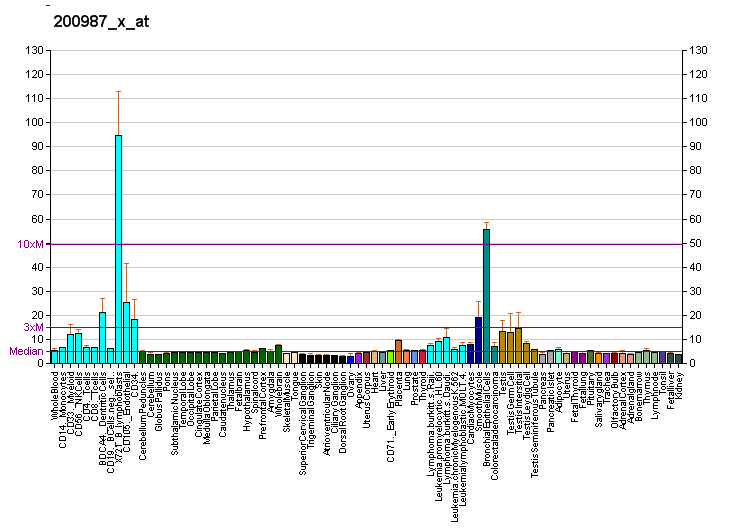

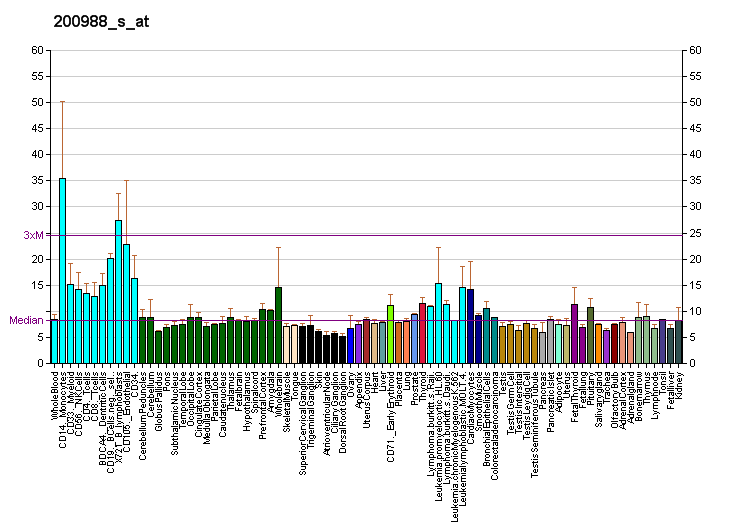
RNA expression pattern
Bgee	Human / Mouse (ortholog); Top expressed in: islet of Langerhans; monocyte; stromal cell of endometrium; rectum; gastrocnemius muscle; appendix; mucosa of esophagus; ganglionic eminence; mucosa of transverse colon; epithelium of colon / Top expressed in: blood; tail of embryo; ascending aorta; yolk sac; aortic valve; genital tubercle; epiblast; ventricular zone; spermatocyte; seminiferous tubule; More reference expression data
BioGPS	More reference expression data
Gene ontology
Molecular function	p53 binding; MDM2/MDM4 family protein binding; endopeptidase activator activity; protein binding; identical protein binding
Cellular component	membrane; proteasome activator complex; nucleoplasm; proteasome complex; nucleus; cytoplasm; cytosol
Biological process	regulation of proteasomal protein catabolic process; regulation of cellular amino acid metabolic process; antigen processing and presentation of exogenous peptide antigen via MHC class I, TAP-dependent; regulation of mRNA stability; positive regulation of canonical Wnt signaling pathway; negative regulation of extrinsic apoptotic signaling pathway; protein polyubiquitination; stimulatory C-type lectin receptor signaling pathway; tumor necrosis factor-mediated signaling pathway; MAPK cascade; Fc-epsilon receptor signaling pathway; regulation of G1/S transition of mitotic cell cycle; NIK/NF-kappaB signaling; cell cycle; anaphase-promoting complex-dependent catabolic process; T cell receptor signaling pathway; negative regulation of canonical Wnt signaling pathway; positive regulation of endopeptidase activity; proteasome-mediated ubiquitin-dependent protein catabolic process; apoptotic process; Wnt signaling pathway, planar cell polarity pathway; negative regulation of G2/M transition of mitotic cell cycle; protein deubiquitination; SCF-dependent proteasomal ubiquitin-dependent protein catabolic process; transmembrane transport; regulation of transcription from RNA polymerase II promoter in response to hypoxia; post-translational protein modification; regulation of hematopoietic stem cell differentiation; interleukin-1-mediated signaling pathway; regulation of mitotic cell cycle phase transition
Sources:Amigo / QuickGO
Orthologs
Databases	NCBI: entry; OMA: entry
Species	Human	Mouse
Entrez	10197	19192
Ensembl	ENSG00000131467	ENSMUSG00000078652
UniProt	P61289	P61290
RefSeq (mRNA)	NM_001267045; NM_005789; NM_176863; NM_001330229	NM_011192
RefSeq (protein)	NP_001253974; NP_001317158; NP_005780; NP_789839	NP_035322
Location (UCSC)	Chr 17: 42.82 – 42.84 Mb	Chr 11: 101.21 – 101.21 Mb
PubMed search
- Wikidata
View/Edit Human	View/Edit Mouse

Proteasome activator complex subunit 3 is a protein encoded by the PSME3 gene in humans.

== Function ==
The 26S proteasome is a multicatalytic proteinase complex with a highly ordered structure composed of 2 complexes, a 20S core and a 19S regulator. The 20S core is composed of 4 rings of 28 non-identical subunits; 2 rings are composed of 7 alpha subunits and 2 rings are composed of 7 beta subunits. The 19S regulator is composed of a base, which contains 6 ATPase subunits and 2 non-ATPase subunits, and a lid, which contains up to 10 non-ATPase subunits. Proteasomes are distributed throughout eukaryotic cells at a high concentration and cleave peptides in an ATP/ubiquitin-dependent process in a non-lysosomal pathway. An essential function of a modified proteasome, the immunoproteasome, is the processing of class I MHC peptides. The immunoproteasome contains an alternate regulator, referred to as the 11S regulator or PA28, that replaces the 19S regulator. Three subunits (alpha, beta and gamma) of the 11S regulator have been identified. This gene encodes the gamma subunit of the 11S regulator. Six gamma subunits combine to form a homohexameric ring. Two transcript variants encoding different isoforms have been identified.

== Interactions ==
PSME3 has been shown to interact with P53 and Mdm2.
