= CRISPLD2 =

Protein-coding gene in humans

Identifiers
- Aliases: CRISPLD2, CRISP11, LCRISP2, cysteine rich secretory protein LCCL domain containing 2, LGL1
- External IDs: OMIM: 612434; MGI: 1926142; HomoloGene: 41792; GeneCards: CRISPLD2; OMA:CRISPLD2 - orthologs

Gene location (Human)
Chr.	Chromosome 16 (human)
Band	16q24.1	Start	84,819,985 bp
Band	16q24.1	End	84,920,768 bp

Gene location (Mouse)
Chr.	Chromosome 8 (mouse)
Band	8|8 E1	Start	120,719,177 bp
Band	8|8 E1	End	120,779,532 bp
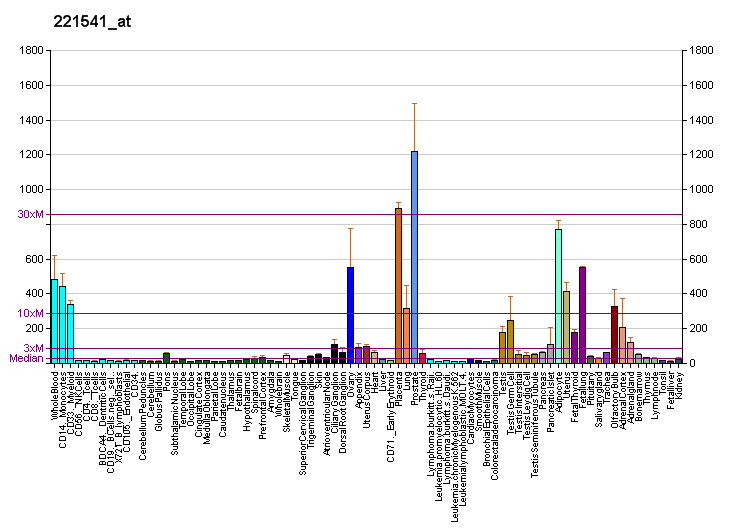
RNA expression pattern
Bgee	Human / Mouse (ortholog); Top expressed in: decidua; tibia; pericardium; left uterine tube; gastric mucosa; mucosa of urinary bladder; tendon of biceps brachii; canal of the cervix; gallbladder; skin of hip / Top expressed in: iris; Paneth cell; sciatic nerve; umbilical cord; aortic valve; skin of external ear; cervix; ascending aorta; cumulus cell; ciliary body; More reference expression data
BioGPS	More reference expression data
Gene ontology
Molecular function	glycosaminoglycan binding; heparin binding
Cellular component	extracellular exosome; transport vesicle; extracellular region; secretory granule lumen; ficolin-1-rich granule lumen; extracellular space; extracellular matrix
Biological process	extracellular matrix organization; face morphogenesis; lung development; neutrophil degranulation
Sources:Amigo / QuickGO
Orthologs
Species	Human	Mouse
Entrez	83716	78892
Ensembl	ENSG00000103196	ENSMUSG00000031825
UniProt	Q9H0B8	Q8BZQ2
RefSeq (mRNA)	NM_031476	NM_030209; NM_001310635
RefSeq (protein)	NP_113664	NP_001297564; NP_084485
Location (UCSC)	Chr 16: 84.82 – 84.92 Mb	Chr 8: 120.72 – 120.78 Mb
PubMed search
- Wikidata
View/Edit Human	View/Edit Mouse

Cysteine-rich secretory protein LCCL domain-containing 2 is a cysteine-rich secretory protein that in humans is encoded by the CRISPLD2 gene.

It has been predicted or experimentally observed to interact with C1orf173.
