= 60S ribosomal protein L26 =

Protein found in humans

RPL26

Identifiers
- Aliases: RPL26, DBA11, L26, ribosomal protein L26
- External IDs: OMIM: 603704; MGI: 106022; GeneCards: RPL26
Available structures
PDB	Ortholog search: PDBe RCSB
PDB	List of PDB id codes 4UG0, 4V6X, 5AJ0, 3J92, 4UJC, 3J7P, 4UJE, 3J7Q, 3J7R, 4D67, 4UJD, 4V5Z, 4D5Y, 3J7O

Gene location (Human)
Chr.	Chromosome 17 (human)
Band	17p13.1	Start	8,377,516 bp
Band	17p13.1	End	8,383,213 bp

Gene location (Mouse)
Chr.	Chromosome 11 (mouse)
Band	11|11 B3	Start	68,792,409 bp
Band	11|11 B3	End	68,797,815 bp
RNA expression pattern
Bgee	Human / Mouse (ortholog); Top expressed in: Achilles tendon; ganglionic eminence; left ovary; right ovary; granulocyte; monocyte; lymph node; corpus callosum; canal of the cervix; fallopian tube / Top expressed in: medial ganglionic eminence; transitional epithelium of urinary bladder; hair follicle; efferent ductule; migratory enteric neural crest cell; dermis; endothelial cell of lymphatic vessel; abdominal wall; skin of external ear; fossa; More reference expression data
BioGPS	n/a
Gene ontology
Molecular function	protein binding; RNA binding; structural constituent of ribosome; mRNA 5'-UTR binding
Cellular component	cytosol; ribosome; membrane; large ribosomal subunit; intracellular anatomical structure; cytosolic large ribosomal subunit; extracellular exosome; nucleoplasm; nucleolus; cytoplasm; cytosolic ribosome; ribonucleoprotein complex
Biological process	protein biosynthesis; viral transcription; SRP-dependent cotranslational protein targeting to membrane; ribosomal large subunit biogenesis; translational initiation; nuclear-transcribed mRNA catabolic process, nonsense-mediated decay; rRNA processing; cytoplasmic translation; DNA damage response, signal transduction by p53 class mediator resulting in cell cycle arrest; cellular response to UV; positive regulation of translation; cellular response to ionizing radiation; cellular response to gamma radiation; positive regulation of DNA damage response, signal transduction by p53 class mediator resulting in transcription of p21 class mediator; positive regulation of intrinsic apoptotic signaling pathway in response to DNA damage by p53 class mediator; regulation of translation involved in cellular response to UV
Sources:Amigo / QuickGO
Orthologs
Databases	NCBI: entry; OMA: entry
Species	Human	Mouse
Entrez	6154	19941
Ensembl	ENSG00000161970	ENSMUSG00000060938
UniProt	P61254	P61255
RefSeq (mRNA)	NM_000987; NM_001315530; NM_001315531	NM_009080
RefSeq (protein)	NP_000978; NP_001302459; NP_001302460	NP_033106
Location (UCSC)	Chr 17: 8.38 – 8.38 Mb	Chr 11: 68.79 – 68.8 Mb
PubMed search
- Wikidata
View/Edit Human	View/Edit Mouse

Large ribosomal subunit protein uL24 is a protein that in humans is encoded by the RPL26 gene.

== Function ==
Cytosolic ribosomes, organelles that catalyze protein synthesis, consist of a small 40S subunit and a large 60S subunit. Together these subunits are composed of 4 rRNA species and approximately 80 structurally distinct proteins. This gene encodes a ribosomal protein that is a component of the 60S subunit. The protein belongs to the universal ribosomal protein uL24 family. It is located in the cytoplasm. As is typical for genes encoding ribosomal proteins, there are multiple processed pseudogenes of this gene dispersed through the genome and the human paralog RPL26L1.

== Interactions ==
RPL26 has been shown to interact with Mdm2.

== See also ==
- Eukaryotic translation
- 60S ribosomal subunit
