= RPL26L1 =

Protein-coding gene in the species Homo sapiens

Identifiers
- Aliases: RPL26L1, RPL26P1, ribosomal protein L26 like 1
- External IDs: MGI: 106022; GeneCards: RPL26L1

Gene location (Human)
Chr.	Chromosome 5 (human)
Band	5q35.1	Start	172,958,729 bp
Band	5q35.1	End	172,969,771 bp

Gene location (Mouse)
Chr.	Chromosome 11 (mouse)
Band	11|11 B3	Start	68,792,409 bp
Band	11|11 B3	End	68,797,815 bp
RNA expression pattern
Bgee	Human / Mouse (ortholog); Top expressed in: left testis; right testis; islet of Langerhans; gonad; ganglionic eminence; testicle; stromal cell of endometrium; right adrenal gland; left adrenal gland; right adrenal cortex / Top expressed in: medial ganglionic eminence; transitional epithelium of urinary bladder; hair follicle; efferent ductule; migratory enteric neural crest cell; dermis; endothelial cell of lymphatic vessel; abdominal wall; skin of external ear; fossa; More reference expression data
BioGPS	n/a
Gene ontology
Molecular function	RNA binding; structural constituent of ribosome
Cellular component	ribosome; large ribosomal subunit; intracellular anatomical structure; extracellular exosome; cytosolic large ribosomal subunit
Biological process	protein biosynthesis; cytoplasmic translation; ribosomal large subunit biogenesis
Sources:Amigo / QuickGO
Orthologs
Databases	NCBI: entry; OMA: entry
Species	Human	Mouse
Entrez	51121	19941
Ensembl	ENSG00000037241	ENSMUSG00000060938
UniProt	Q9UNX3	P61255
RefSeq (mRNA)	NM_016093; NM_001317980; NM_001317981; NM_001317982	NM_009080
RefSeq (protein)	NP_001304909; NP_001304910; NP_001304911; NP_057177	NP_033106
Location (UCSC)	Chr 5: 172.96 – 172.97 Mb	Chr 11: 68.79 – 68.8 Mb
PubMed search
- Wikidata
View/Edit Human	View/Edit Mouse

Ribosomal protein L26 like 1 is a protein that in humans is encoded by the RPL26L1 gene.

== Function ==
This gene encodes a protein that shares high sequence similarity with RPL26. Alternative splicing results in multiple transcript variants encoding the same protein. [provided by RefSeq, Dec 2015].
