= TLE3 =

Protein-coding gene in the species Homo sapiens

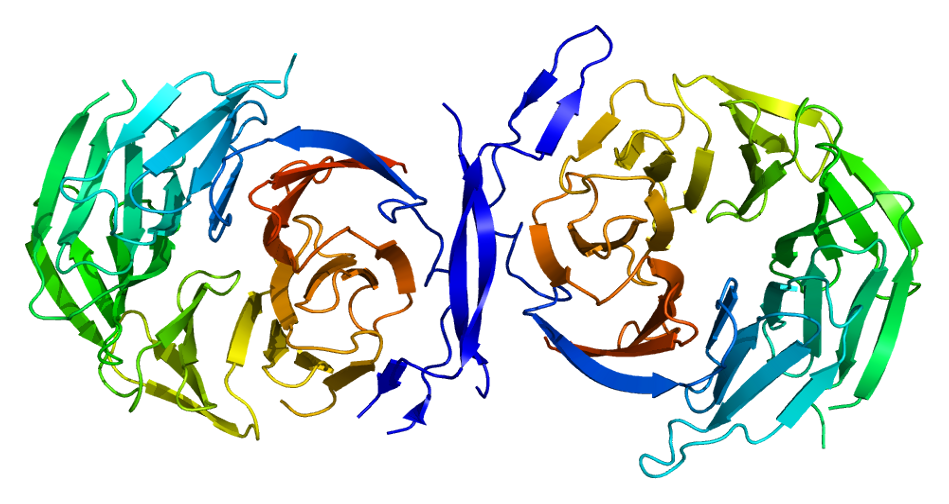

Identifiers
- Aliases: TLE3, ESG, ESG3, GRG3, HsT18976, transducin like enhancer of split 3, TLE family member 3, transcriptional corepressor
- External IDs: OMIM: 600190; MGI: 104634; GeneCards: TLE3

Gene location (Human)
| Chr. | Chromosome 15 (human) |
| Band | 15q23 | Start | 70,047,790 bp |
| Band | 15q23 | End | 70,098,176 bp |

Gene location (Mouse)
| Chr. | Chromosome 9 (mouse) |
| Band | 9|9 B | Start | 61,279,648 bp |
| Band | 9|9 B | End | 61,325,779 bp |
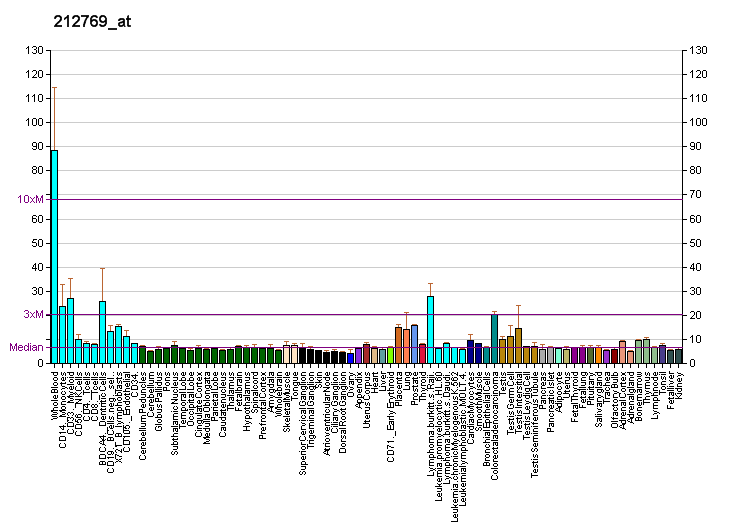

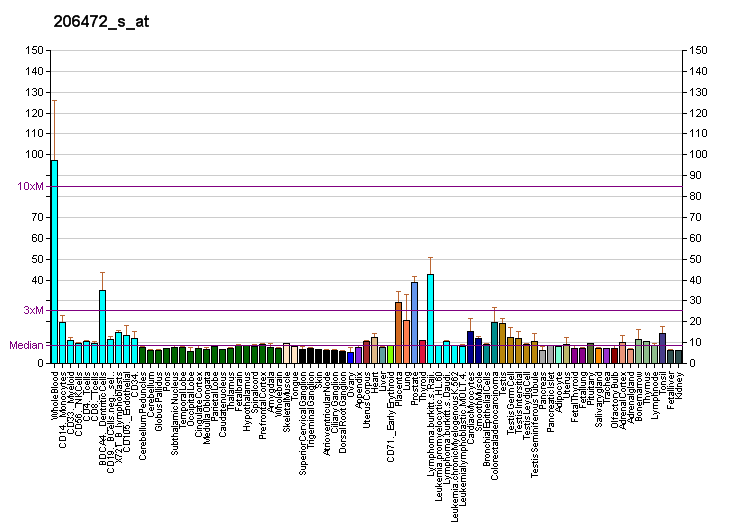

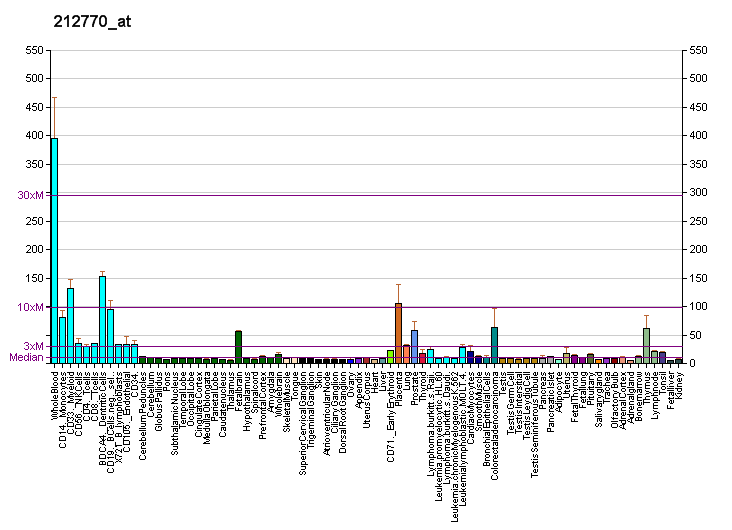
RNA expression pattern
| Bgee | Human / Mouse (ortholog); Top expressed in: blood; ganglionic eminence; sural nerve; ventricular zone; skin of leg; buccal mucosa cell; right testis; monocyte; left testis; skin of abdomen / Top expressed in: genital tubercle; Rostral migratory stream; tail of embryo; granulocyte; decidua; ventricular zone; hair follicle; lacrimal gland; intestinal villus; molar; More reference expression data |
| BioGPS | More reference expression data |
Gene ontology
| Molecular function | protein binding; transcription corepressor activity |
| Cellular component | nucleus; nucleoplasm; beta-catenin-TCF complex; transcription regulator complex |
| Biological process | animal organ morphogenesis; regulation of transcription, DNA-templated; Wnt signaling pathway; transcription, DNA-templated; signal transduction; beta-catenin-TCF complex assembly; negative regulation of canonical Wnt signaling pathway; negative regulation of cold-induced thermogenesis; negative regulation of nucleic acid-templated transcription |
Sources:Amigo / QuickGO
Orthologs
| Databases | NCBI: entry; OMA: entry |
| Species | Human | Mouse |
| Entrez | 7090 | 21887 |
| Ensembl | ENSG00000140332 | ENSMUSG00000032280 |
| UniProt | Q04726; Q6PRX3 | Q08122 |
| RefSeq (mRNA) | NM_001105192; NM_001282979; NM_001282980; NM_001282981; NM_001282982 NM_005078; NM_020908 | NM_001083927; NM_001083928; NM_009389 |
| RefSeq (protein) | NP_001098662; NP_001269908; NP_001269909; NP_001269910; NP_001269911 NP_005069; NP_065959; NP_001269908.1 | NP_001077396; NP_001077397; NP_033415 |
| Location (UCSC) | Chr 15: 70.05 – 70.1 Mb | Chr 9: 61.28 – 61.33 Mb |
| PubMed search |
- Wikidata
| View/Edit Human | View/Edit Mouse |

Transducin-like enhancer protein 3 is a protein that in humans is encoded by the TLE3 gene.

TLE3 expression has been linked to higher survival rates for lung cancer patients.
