= Mdm2 =

Protein-coding gene in humans

MDM2
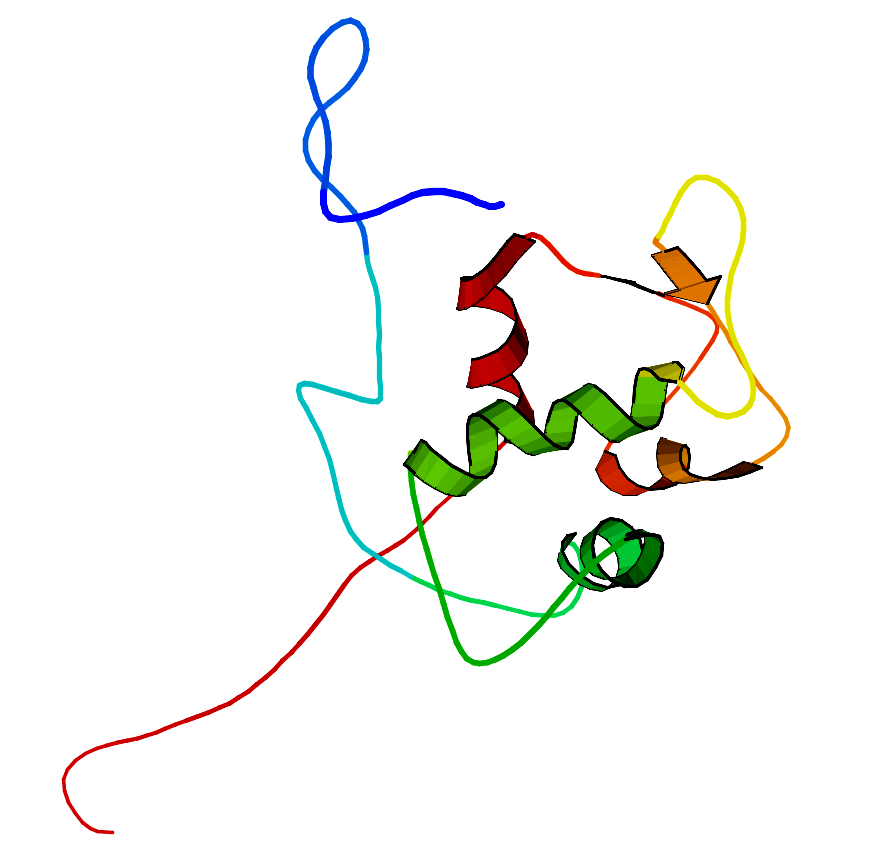

Identifiers
- Aliases: MDM2, ACTFS, HDMX, hdm2, MDM2 proto-oncogene, LSKB
- External IDs: OMIM: 164785; MGI: 96952; GeneCards: MDM2
Available structures
PDB	Ortholog search: PDBe RCSB
PDB	List of PDB id codes 1RV1, 1T4E, 1T4F, 1YCR, 1Z1M, 2AXI, 2C6A, 2C6B, 2FOP, 2GV2, 2HDP, 2LZG, 2M86, 2MPS, 2RUH, 2VJE, 2VJF, 3EQS, 3G03, 3IUX, 3IWY, 3JZK, 3JZR, 3JZS, 3LBK, 3LBL, 3LNJ, 3LNZ, 3MQS, 3TJ2, 3TPX, 3TU1, 3V3B, 3VBG, 3VZV, 3W69, 4DIJ, 4ERE, 4ERF, 4HBM, 4HFZ, 4HG7, 4JV7, 4JV9, 4JVE, 4JVR, 4JWR, 4MDN, 4MDQ, 4OAS, 4OBA, 4OCC, 4ODE, 4ODF, 4OGN, 4OGT, 4OGV, 4OQ3, 4QO4, 4QOC, 4UMN, 4WT2, 4XXB, 4ZYC, 4ZYF, 4ZYI, 4UE1, 4UD7, 5AFG, 5HMI, 5HMK, 5HMH, 5C5A
Enzyme activity
EC #	BRENDA	ExPASy	KEGG	MetaCyc
2.3.2.27	↗	↗	↗	↗

Gene location (Human)
Chr.	Chromosome 12 (human)
Band	12q15	Start	68,808,177 bp
Band	12q15	End	68,845,544 bp

Gene location (Mouse)
Chr.	Chromosome 10 (mouse)
Band	10 D2|10 66.32 cM	Start	117,524,780 bp
Band	10 D2|10 66.32 cM	End	117,546,663 bp
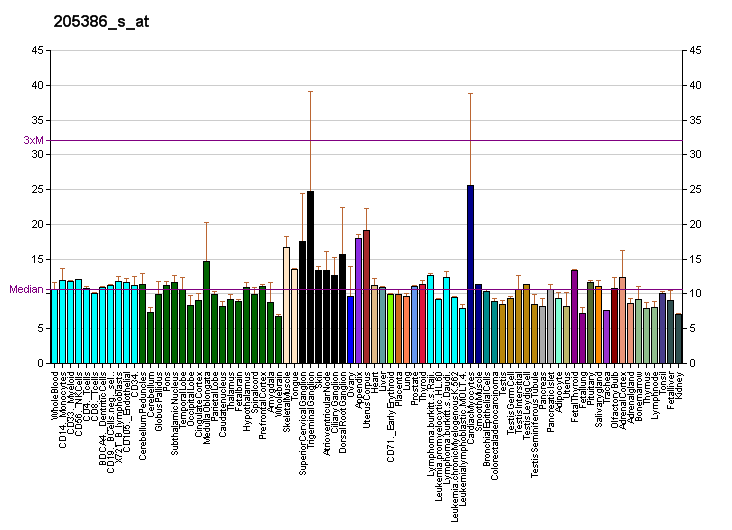

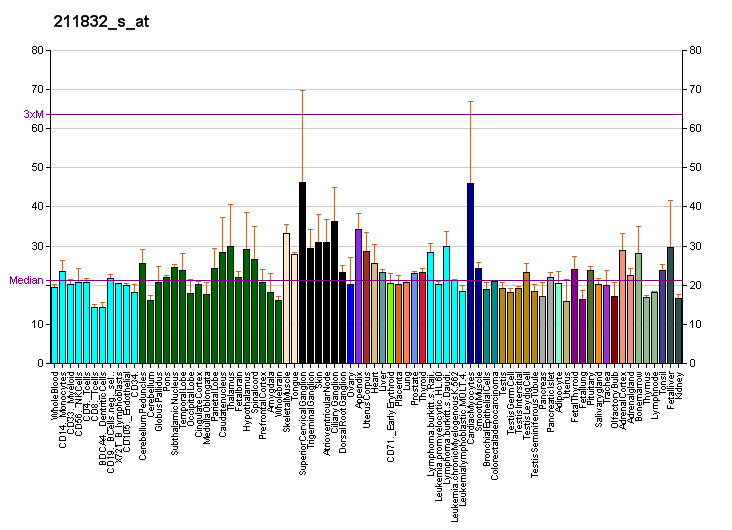

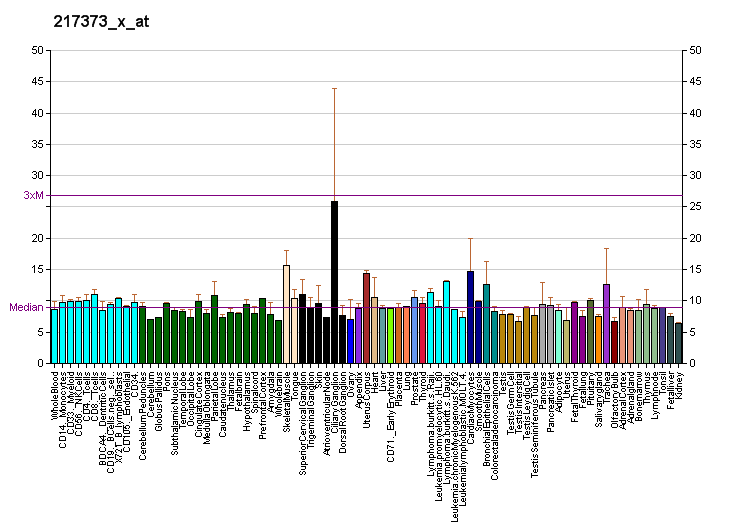
RNA expression pattern
Bgee	Human / Mouse (ortholog); Top expressed in: Achilles tendon; ventricular zone; right uterine tube; olfactory zone of nasal mucosa; sural nerve; epithelium of colon; epithelium of nasopharynx; stromal cell of endometrium; right lobe of liver; ganglionic eminence / Top expressed in: zygote; gastrula; seminiferous tubule; spermatocyte; granulocyte; spermatid; aortic valve; secondary oocyte; ascending aorta; muscle of thigh; More reference expression data
BioGPS	More reference expression data
Gene ontology
Molecular function	scaffold protein binding; protein binding; enzyme binding; metal ion binding; identical protein binding; ubiquitin protein ligase binding; p53 binding; SUMO transferase activity; ubiquitin-protein transferase activity; transferase activity; ligase activity; 5S rRNA binding; zinc ion binding; ribonucleoprotein complex binding; protein N-terminus binding; ubiquitin protein ligase activity; NEDD8 ligase activity; disordered domain specific binding; protein domain specific binding; receptor serine/threonine kinase binding; peroxisome proliferator activated receptor binding; ubiquitin binding
Cellular component	cytosol; endocytic vesicle membrane; plasma membrane; synapse; nuclear body; cytoplasm; nucleus; nucleoplasm; nucleolus; protein-containing complex
Biological process	negative regulation of signal transduction by p53 class mediator; endocardial cushion morphogenesis; cellular response to UV-C; atrial septum development; regulation of heart rate; DNA damage response, signal transduction by p53 class mediator resulting in cell cycle arrest; positive regulation of gene expression; blood vessel development; positive regulation of cell population proliferation; negative regulation of DNA damage response, signal transduction by p53 class mediator; response to ether; blood vessel remodeling; cellular response to hypoxia; heart valve development; cellular response to estrogen stimulus; negative regulation of apoptotic process; cellular response to organic substance; cellular response to hydrogen peroxide; response to cocaine; cardiac septum morphogenesis; negative regulation of transcription by RNA polymerase II; peptidyl-lysine modification; positive regulation of cell cycle; ventricular septum development; positive regulation of protein export from nucleus; response to steroid hormone; cellular response to growth factor stimulus; regulation of protein catabolic process; cellular response to antibiotic; negative regulation of gene expression; positive regulation of mitotic cell cycle; development of the heart; cellular response to alkaloid; cellular response to vitamin B1; response to magnesium ion; negative regulation of cysteine-type endopeptidase activity involved in apoptotic process; positive regulation of proteasomal ubiquitin-dependent protein catabolic process; cellular response to peptide hormone stimulus; cellular response to organic cyclic compound; viral process; response to iron ion; regulation of gene expression; response to antibiotic; traversing start control point of mitotic cell cycle; protein ubiquitination; negative regulation of protein processing; establishment of protein localization; response to toxic substance; response to morphine; atrioventricular valve morphogenesis; protein localization to nucleus; regulation of signal transduction by p53 class mediator; positive regulation of vascular associated smooth muscle cell proliferation; response to water-immersion restraint stress; negative regulation of neuron projection development; positive regulation of vascular associated smooth muscle cell migration; protein deubiquitination; protein sumoylation; transcription factor catabolic process; protein autoubiquitination; response to formaldehyde; protein destabilization; negative regulation of transcription, DNA-templated; proteolysis involved in cellular protein catabolic process; cellular response to gamma radiation; cellular response to actinomycin D; negative regulation of intrinsic apoptotic signaling pathway by p53 class mediator; amyloid fibril formation; protein-containing complex assembly; ubiquitin-dependent protein catabolic process
Sources:Amigo / QuickGO
Orthologs
Databases	NCBI: entry; OMA: entry
Species	Human	Mouse
Entrez	4193	17246
Ensembl	ENSG00000135679	ENSMUSG00000020184
UniProt	Q00987	P23804
RefSeq (mRNA)	NM_001145336; NM_001145337; NM_001145339; NM_001145340; NM_001278462 NM_002392; NM_006878; NM_006879; NM_006880; NM_006881; NM_006882; NM_032739; NM_001367990	NM_001288586; NM_010786
RefSeq (protein)	NP_001138809; NP_001138811; NP_001138812; NP_001265391; NP_002383 NP_001354919	NP_001275515; NP_034916
Location (UCSC)	Chr 12: 68.81 – 68.85 Mb	Chr 10: 117.52 – 117.55 Mb
PubMed search
- Wikidata
View/Edit Human	View/Edit Mouse

Mouse double minute 2 homolog (MDM2) also known as E3 ubiquitin-protein ligase Mdm2 is a protein that in humans is encoded by the MDM2 gene. Mdm2 is an important negative regulator of the p53 tumor suppressor. Mdm2 protein functions both as an E3 ubiquitin ligase that recognizes the N-terminal trans-activation domain (TAD) of the p53 tumor suppressor and as an inhibitor of p53 transcriptional activation. The mdm2 gene is an oncogene, and increased levels of the protein have been found in several types of human tumors, including sarcomas and breast tumors.

== Discovery and expression in tumor cells ==
The murine double minute (mdm2) oncogene, which codes for the Mdm2 protein, was originally cloned, along with two other genes (mdm1 and mdm3) from the transformed mouse cell line 3T3-DM. Mdm2 overexpression, in cooperation with oncogenic Ras, promotes transformation of primary rodent fibroblasts, and mdm2 expression led to tumor formation in nude mice. The human homologue of this protein was later identified and is sometimes called Hdm2. Further supporting the role of mdm2 as an oncogene, several human tumor types have been shown to have increased levels of Mdm2, including soft tissue sarcomas and osteosarcomas as well as breast tumors.

An additional Mdm2 family member, Mdm4 (also called MdmX), has been discovered and is also an important negative regulator of p53.

== Ubiquitination target: p53 ==
The key target of Mdm2 is the p53 tumor suppressor. Mdm2 has been identified as a p53 interacting protein that represses p53 transcriptional activity. Mdm2 achieves this repression by binding to and blocking the N-terminal trans-activation domain of p53. Mdm2 is a p53 responsive gene—that is, its transcription can be activated by p53. Thus when p53 is stabilized, the transcription of Mdm2 is also induced, resulting in higher Mdm2 protein levels.

== E3 ligase activity ==
The E3 ubiquitin ligase MDM2 is a negative regulator of the p53 tumor suppressor protein. MDM2 binds and ubiquitinates p53, facilitating it for degradation. p53 can induce transcription of MDM2, generating a negative feedback loop. Mdm2 also acts as an E3 ubiquitin ligase, targeting both itself and p53 for degradation by the proteasome (see also ubiquitin). Several lysine residues in p53 C-terminus have been identified as the sites of ubiquitination, and it has been shown that p53 protein levels are downregulated by Mdm2 in a proteasome-dependent manner. Mdm2 is capable of auto-polyubiquitination, and in complex with p300, a cooperating E3 ubiquitin ligase, is capable of polyubiquitinating p53. In this manner, Mdm2 and p53 are the members of a negative feedback control loop that keeps the level of p53 low in the absence of p53-stabilizing signals. This loop can be interfered with by kinases and genes like p14arf when p53 activation signals, including DNA damage, are high.

== Structure and function ==
The full-length transcript of the mdm2 gene encodes a protein of 491 amino acids with a predicted molecular weight of 56kDa. This protein contains several conserved structural domains including an N-terminal p53 interaction domain, the structure of which has been solved using x-ray crystallography. The Mdm2 protein also contains a central acidic domain (residues 230–300). The phosphorylation of residues within this domain appears to be important for regulation of Mdm2 function. In addition, this region contains nuclear export and import signals that are essential for proper nuclear-cytoplasmic trafficking of Mdm2. Another conserved domain within the Mdm2 protein is a zinc finger domain, the function of which is poorly understood.

Mdm2 also contains a C-terminal RING domain (amino acid residues 430–480), which contains a Cis3-His2-Cis3 consensus that coordinates two ions of zinc. These residues are required for zinc binding, which is essential for proper folding of the RING domain. The RING domain of Mdm2 confers E3 ubiquitin ligase activity and is sufficient for E3 ligase activity in Mdm2 RING autoubiquitination. The RING domain of Mdm2 is unique in that it incorporates a conserved Walker A or P-loop motif characteristic of nucleotide binding proteins, as well as a nucleolar localization sequence. The RING domain also binds specifically to RNA, although the function of this is poorly understood.

== Regulation ==
There are several known mechanisms for regulation of Mdm2. One of these mechanisms is phosphorylation of the Mdm2 protein. Mdm2 is phosphorylated at multiple sites in cells. Following DNA damage, phosphorylation of Mdm2 leads to changes in protein function and stabilization of p53. Additionally, phosphorylation at certain residues within the central acidic domain of Mdm2 may stimulate its ability to target p53 for degradation. HIPK2 is a protein that regulates Mdm2 in this way. The induction of the p14arf protein, the alternate reading frame product of the p16INK4a locus, is also a mechanism of negatively regulating the p53-Mdm2 interaction. p14arf directly interacts with Mdm2 and leads to up-regulation of p53 transcriptional response. ARF sequesters Mdm2 in the nucleolus, resulting in inhibition of nuclear export and activation of p53, since nuclear export is essential for proper p53 degradation.

Inhibitors of the MDM2-p53 interaction include the cis-imidazoline analog nutlin.

Levels and stability of Mdm2 are also modulated by ubiquitylation. Mdm2 auto ubiquitylates itself, which allows for its degradation by the proteasome. Mdm2 also interacts with a ubiquitin specific protease, USP7, which can reverse Mdm2-ubiquitylation and prevent it from being degraded by the proteasome. USP7 also protects from degradation the p53 protein, which is a major target of Mdm2. Thus Mdm2 and USP7 form an intricate circuit to finely regulate the stability and activity of p53, whose levels are critical for its function.

== Interactions ==
Overview of signal transduction pathways involved in apoptosis

Mdm2 has been shown to interact with:

- ABL1,
- ARRB1,
- ARRB2,
- CCNG1,
- CTBP1,
- CTBP2,
- DAXX,
- DHFR,
- EP300,
- ERICH3,
- FKBP3,
- FOXO4,
- GNL3,
- HDAC1,
- HIF1A,
- HTATIP,
- IGF1R,
- MDM4,
- NUMB,
- P16,
- P53,
- P73,
- PCAF,
- PSMD10,
- PSME3,
- RPL5,
- RPL11,
- PML,
- RPL26,
- RRM2B,
- RYBP,
- TBP, and
- UBC.

== Mdm2 p53-independent role ==
Mdm2 overexpression was shown to inhibit DNA double-strand break repair mediated through a novel, direct interaction between Mdm2 and Nbs1 and independent of p53. Regardless of p53 status, increased levels of Mdm2, but not Mdm2 lacking its Nbs1-binding domain, caused delays in DNA break repair, chromosomal abnormalities, and genome instability. These data demonstrated Mdm2-induced genome instability can be mediated through Mdm2:Nbs1 interactions and independent from its association with p53.
