= SLC45A4 =

Protein

Identifiers
- Aliases: SLC45A4, solute carrier family 45 member 4
- External IDs: MGI: 2146236; GeneCards: SLC45A4

Gene location (Human)
Chr.	Chromosome 8 (human)
Band	8q24.3	Start	141,207,166 bp
Band	8q24.3	End	141,308,305 bp

Gene location (Mouse)
Chr.	Chromosome 15 (mouse)
Band	15|15 D3	Start	73,449,273 bp
Band	15|15 D3	End	73,517,611 bp
RNA expression pattern
Bgee	Human / Mouse (ortholog); Top expressed in: pancreatic ductal cell; endothelial cell; blood; retinal pigment epithelium; postcentral gyrus; Brodmann area 23; middle temporal gyrus; primary visual cortex; Achilles tendon; bronchial epithelial cell / Top expressed in: submandibular gland; Epithelium of choroid plexus; retinal pigment epithelium; facial motor nucleus; vastus lateralis muscle; molar; triceps brachii muscle; extraocular muscle; vestibular membrane of cochlear duct; olfactory epithelium; More reference expression data
BioGPS	n/a
Gene ontology
Molecular function	sucrose:proton symporter activity
Cellular component	membrane; integral component of membrane
Biological process	sucrose transport
Sources:Amigo / QuickGO
Orthologs
Databases	NCBI: entry; OMA: entry
Species	Human	Mouse
Entrez	57210	106068
Ensembl	ENSG00000022567	ENSMUSG00000079020
UniProt	Q5BKX6	Q0P5V9
RefSeq (mRNA)	NM_001080431; NM_001286646; NM_001286648	NM_001033219; NM_001168255; NM_001357747
RefSeq (protein)	NP_001073900; NP_001273575; NP_001273577	NP_001028391; NP_001161727; NP_001344676
Location (UCSC)	Chr 8: 141.21 – 141.31 Mb	Chr 15: 73.45 – 73.52 Mb
PubMed search
- Wikidata
View/Edit Human	View/Edit Mouse

SLC45A4 is a member of the SLC45 family of solute carriers. Analysis of the protein function in a recombinant yeast expression assay show that it can: (i) transport a disaccharide, sucrose, as well simple sugars such as glucose and fructose (ii) perform secondary active transport in a proton-dependent manner.

It is associated with sugar transport in the spermatozoa. Additionally, it has been identified as a necessary component in the cell death caused of the compound paraquat.
