= LAPC4 =

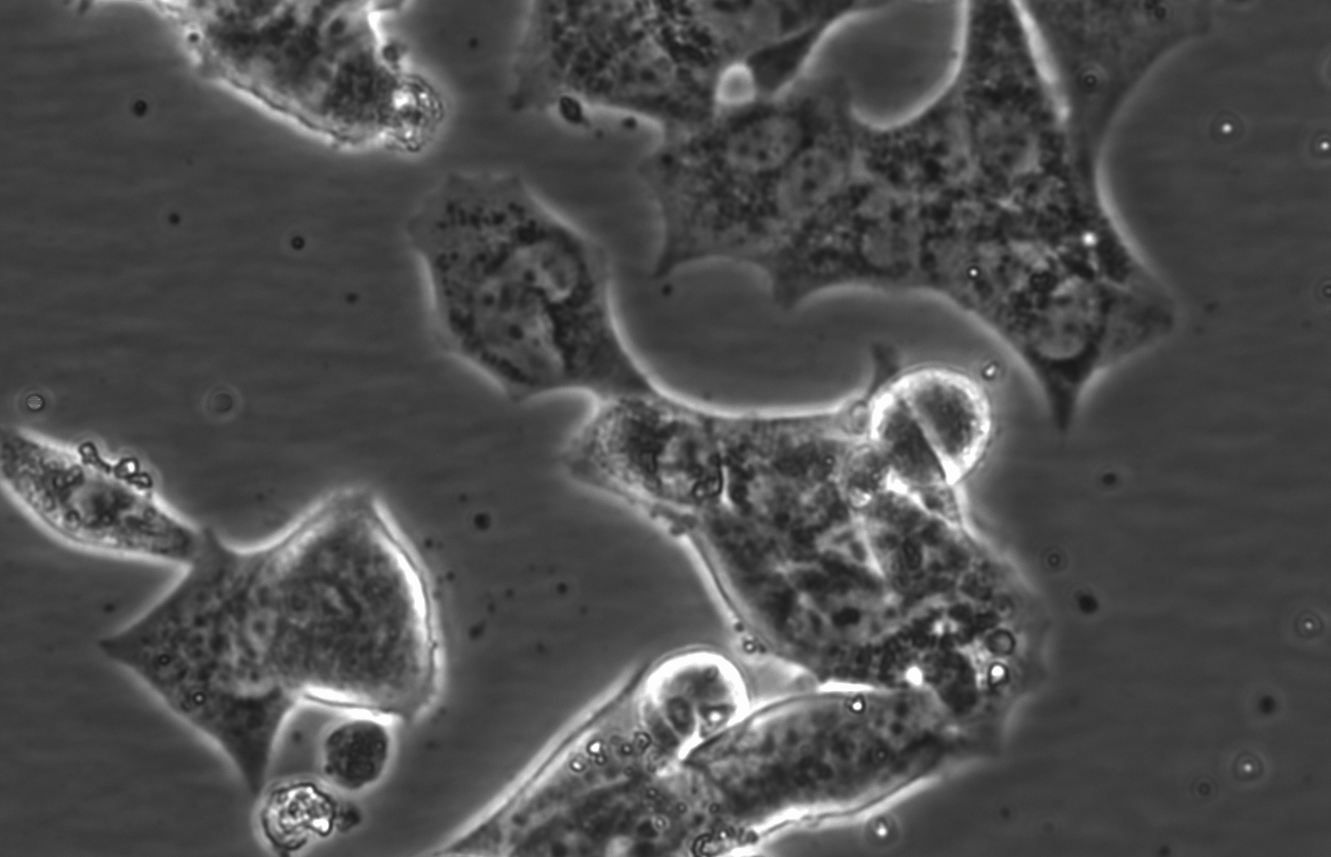
Representative phase-contrast image of LAPC4 cells. 32X magnification.

LAPC4 cells are a cell line of human prostate cancer commonly used in the field of oncology. The tissue was harvested from the lymph node metastasis of a male patient with hormone refractory prostate cancer which was then xenografted into SCID mice and later harvested and plated on tissue culture dishes, where it can be propagated as an immortalized prostate cancer cell line.

== Characteristics ==
LAPC4 are a lowly adherent, epithelial cell line with high Androgen receptor and Prostate specific antigen expression. Unlike the other commonly utilized, Androgen receptor positive prostate cancer cell lines LNCaP and VCaP, LAPC4 have high expression of Keratin 5, a basal marker, as well as the luminal markers Keratin 8 and Keratin 18. LAPC4 also expresses mutated P53 (R175H).

The cells have an approximate doubling time of 72 hours under typical culture conditions.
