= P14arf =

Human protein

cyclin-dependent kinase inhibitor 2A (melanoma, p16, inhibits CDK4)

Identifiers
- Symbol: CDKN2A
- Alt. symbols: CDKN2, MLM
- NCBI gene: 1029
- HGNC: 1787
- OMIM: 600160
- RefSeq: NM_058195
- UniProt: P42771

Other data
- Locus: Chr. 9 p21
Search for
- Structures: Swiss-model
- Domains: InterPro

p14ARF (also called ARF tumor suppressor, ARF, p14^{ARF}) is an alternate reading frame protein product of the CDKN2A locus (i.e. INK4a/ARF locus). p14ARF is induced in response to elevated mitogenic stimulation, such as aberrant growth signaling from MYC and Ras (protein). It accumulates mainly in the nucleolus where it forms stable complexes with NPM or Mdm2. These interactions allow p14ARF to act as a tumor suppressor by inhibiting ribosome biogenesis or initiating p53-dependent cell cycle arrest and apoptosis, respectively. p14ARF is an atypical protein, in terms of its transcription, its amino acid composition, and its degradation: it is transcribed in an alternate reading frame of a different protein, it is highly basic, and it is polyubiquinated at the N-terminus.

The equivalent in mice is p19ARF.

== Gene ==
Its gene locus is on the short arm of chromosome 9 in humans, and on a corresponding location on chromosome 4 in mice. It is located near the genes for the tandem repeats INK4a and INK4b, which are 16 kDa (p16^{INK4a}) and 15 kDa (p15^{INK4b}) proteins, respectively. These INK4 proteins directly inhibit the cyclin D-dependent kinases CDK4 and CDK6. There are other INK4 genes on other chromosomes, however these are not linked to cancer, and so their functions are not likely to be overlapping.

In addition to the INK4a protein, the unrelated protein, ARF, is transcribed from an alternate reading frame at the INK4a/ARF locus. INK4a and p14ARF mRNA each consist of three exons. They share exons 2 and 3, but there are two different exon 1 transcripts, α and β. Exon 1β (E1β) is intercalated between the genes for INK4a and INK4b. Although exon 1α (E1α) and E1β are about the same in terms of content and size, the 5’ AUG (start codon) of exon 1β has its own promoter and opens an alternative reading frame in exon 2, hence the name p14ARF (ARF exon 3 is not translated). Because of this, INK4a and p14ARF have unrelated amino acid sequences despite overlapping coding regions and have distinct functions. This dual-use of coding sequences is not commonly seen in mammals, making p14ARF an unusual protein. When the ARF β-transcript was found, it was thought that it probably would not encode a protein. In humans, ARF is translated into the 14kDa, 132 amino acid [[p14^{ARF}]] protein, and in mice, it is translated into the 19kDa, 169 amino acid p19^{Arf}. The E1β protein segment of mouse and human ARF are 45% identical, with an overall ARF identity of 50%, compared to a 72% identity between mouse and human INK4a E1α segment, and a 65% overall identity.

== Regulation ==
ARF expression is regulated by oncogenic signaling. Aberrant mitogenic stimulation, such as by MYC or Ras (protein), will increase its expression, as will an amplification of mutated p53 or Mdm2, or p53 loss. ARF can also be induced by enforced E2F expression. Although E2F expression is increased during the cell cycle, ARF expression probably is not because the activation of a second, unknown transcription factor might be needed to prevent an ARF response to transient E2F increases. ARF is negatively regulated by Rb-E2F complexes and by amplified p53 activation. Aberrant growth signals also increase smARF expression.

== Protein ==
=== Structure ===
ARF is a highly basic (pI>12) and hydrophobic protein. Its basic nature is attributed to its arginine content; more than 20% of its amino acids are arginine, and it contains little or no lysine. Due to these characteristics, ARF is likely to be unstructured unless it is bound to other targets. It reportedly complexes with more than 25 proteins, although the significance of each of these interactions is not known.

=== Stability and degradation ===
The half-life of ARF is about 6 hours, while the half-life of smARF is less than 1 hour. Both isoforms are degraded in the proteasome. ARF is targeted for the proteasome by N-terminus ubiquitylation. Proteins are usually ubiquinated at lysine residues. Human [[p14^{ARF}]], however, does not contain any lysines, and mouse p19^{Arf} only contains one lysine. If the mouse lysine is replaced with arginine, there is no effect on its degradation, suggesting it is also ubiquinated at the N-terminus. This adds to the uniqueness of the ARF proteins, because most eukaryotic proteins are acetylated at the N-terminus, preventing ubiquitination at this location. Penultimate residues affect the efficiency of acetylation, in that acetylation is promoted by acidic residues and inhibited by basic ones. The N-terminal amino acid sequences of p19^{Arf} (Met-Gly-Arg) and p14^{ARF} (Met-Val-Arg) would be processed by methionine aminopeptidase but would not be acetylated, allowing ubiquitination to proceed. The sequence of smARF, however, predicts that the initiating methionine would not be cleaved by methionine aminopeptidase and would probably be acetylated, and so is degraded by the proteasome without ubiquitination.

Full-length nucleolar ARF appears to be stabilized by NPM. The NPM-ARF complex does not block the N-terminus of ARF but likely protects ARF from being accessed by degradation machinery. The mitochondrial matrix protein p32 stabilizes smARF. This protein binds various cellular and viral proteins, but its exact function is unknown. Knocking down p32 dramatically decreases smARF levels by increasing its turnover. The levels of p19^{Arf} are not affected by p32 knockdown, and so p32 specifically stabilizes smARF, possibly by protecting it from the proteasome or from mitochondrial proteases.

== Function ==
Although p16INK4a and p14ARF are encoded by the same locus, they suppress cell proliferation through different pathways. p16INK4a inhibits CDK4 and CDK6, helping maintain the retinoblastoma protein (Rb) in its active, hypophosphorylated state, which restrains E2F-dependent transcription and cell cycle progression. In contrast, p14ARF inhibits MDM2, thereby supporting p53 activity.

An important cyclin-dependent substrate is the retinoblastoma protein Rb, which is phosphorylated in late gap 1 phase (G1 phase), allowing G1 exit. The Rb protein limits cell proliferation by blocking the activity of E2F transcription factors, which activate the transcription of genes needed for DNA replication.

When Rb is phosphorylated by cyclin D and E-dependent kinases during the G1 phase of the cell cycle, Rb can not block E2F-dependent transcription, and the cell can progress to the DNA synthetic phase(S phase). Therefore, INK4a and INK4b serve as tumor suppressors by restricting proliferation though the inhibition of the CDKs responsible for Rb phosphorylation.

=== MDM2–p53 pathway ===
Although the INK4a and ARF proteins are structurally and functionally different, they are both involved in cell cycle progression. Together, their broad inhibitory role may help counter oncogenic signals. As mentioned above, INK4a inhibits proliferation by indirectly allowing Rb to remain associated with E2F transcription factors. ARF is involved in p53 activation by inhibiting Mdm2 (HDM2 in humans). Mdm2 binds to p53, inhibiting its transcriptional activity. Mdm2 also has E3 ubiquitin ligase activity toward p53, and promotes its exportation from the cell nucleus to the cytoplasm for degradation. By antagonizing Mdm2, ARF permits the transcriptional activity of p53 that would lead to cell cycle arrest or apoptosis. A loss of ARF or p53, therefore, would give cells a survival advantage.

Both p16INK4a and p14ARF are involved in cell cycle regulation. p14ARF inhibits mdm2, thus promoting p53, which promotes p21 activation, which then binds and inactivates certain cyclin-CDK complexes, which would otherwise promote transcription of genes that would carry the cell through the G_{1}/S checkpoint of the cell cycle. Loss of p14ARF by a homozygous mutation in the CDKN2A (INK4A) gene will lead to elevated levels in mdm2 and, therefore, loss of p53 function and cell cycle control.

=== Ribosome biogenesis ===
The function of ARF has primarily been attributed to its Mdm2/p53 mechanism. ARF does, however, also inhibit proliferation in cells lacking p53 or p53 and Mdm2. In 2004 has been found that one of ARF's p53-independent functions involves its binding to nucleophosmin/B23 (NPM). NPM is an acidic ribosomal chaperone (protein) involved in preribosomal processing and nuclear exportation independent of p53, and oligomerizes with itself and p14^{ARF}. Nearly half of p14^{ARF} is found in NPM-containing complexes with high molecular mass (2 to 5 MDa). Enforced expression of ARF retards early 47S/45S rRNA precursor processing and inhibits 32S rRNA cleavage. This suggests that p14^{ARF} can bind to NPM, inhibiting rRNA processing.

ARF-null cells have increased nucleolar area, increased ribosome biogenesis, and a corresponding increase in protein synthesis. The larger size resulting from more ribosomes and protein is not associated with increased proliferation, however, and this ARF-null phenotype occurs even though the normal basal levels of Arf are usually low. Knocking down ARF with siRNA to exon 1β results in increased rRNA transcripts, rRNA processing, and ribosome nuclear export. The unrestrained ribosome biogenesis seen when NPM is not bound to ARF does not occur if NPM is also absent. Although the induction of ARF in response to oncogenic signals is considered to be of primary importance, the low levels of ARF seen in interphase cells also has a considerable effect in terms of keeping cell growth in check. Therefore, the function of basal level ARF in the NPM/ARF complex appears to be to monitor steady-state ribosome biogenesis and growth independently of preventing proliferation.

=== SUMO conjugation ===
One of the interactions that ARF takes part in results in sumoylating activity, suggesting that ARF may modify proteins to which it binds. The SUMO protein is a small ubiquitin-like modifier, which is added to lysyl ε-amino groups. This process involves a three-enzyme cascade similar to the way ubiquitylation occurs. E1 is an activating enzyme, E2 is a conjugation enzyme, and E3 is a ligase. ARF associates with UBC9, the only SUMO E2 known, suggesting ARF facilitates SUMO conjugation. The importance of this role is unknown, as sumoylation is involved in different functions, such as protein trafficking, ubiquitylation interference, and gene expression changes.

== Mitochondrial isoform (smARF) ==
The two known effects of ARF were growth inhibition by NPM interactions and apoptosis induction by Mdm2 interactions. The function of ARF involving p53-independent death, has now been attributed to the small mitochondrial isoform of ARF, smARF. While full-length ARF inhibits cell growth by cell cycle arrest or type I apoptotic death, smARF kills cells by type II autophagic death. Like ARF, the expression of smARF increases when there are aberrant proliferation signals. When smARF is overexpressed, it localizes to the mitochondrial matrix, damaging the mitochondria membrane potential and structure, and leading to autophagic cell death.

The translation of the truncated ARF, smARF, is initiated at an internal methionine (M45) of the ARF transcript in human and mouse cells. SmARF is also detected in rats, even though an internal methionine is not present in the rat transcript. This suggests that there is an alternate mechanism to form smARF, underscoring the importance of this isoform. The role of smARF is distinct from that of ARF, as it lacks the nuclear localization signal (NLS) and cannot bind to Mdm2 or NPM. In some cell types, however, full-length ARF can also localize to the mitochondria and induce type II cell death, suggesting that in addition to autophagy being a starvation or other environmental response, it may also be involved in responding to oncogene activation.

== Clinical significance ==
Very commonly, cancer is associated with a loss of function of INK4a, ARF, Rb, or p53. Without INK4a, Cdk4/6 can inappropriately phosphorylate Rb, leading to increased E2F-dependent transcription. Without ARF, Mdm2 can inappropriately inhibit p53, leading to increased cell survival.

The INK4a/ARF locus is found to be deleted or silenced in many kinds of tumors. For example, of the 100 primary breast carcinomas, approximately 41% have p14^{ARF} defects. In a separate study, 32% of colorectal adenomas (non-cancerous tumors) were found to have p14^{ARF} inactivation due to hypermethylation of the promoter. Mouse models lacking p19^{Arf}, p53, and Mdm2 are more prone to tumor development than mice without Mdm2 and p53, alone. This suggests that p19^{Arf} has Mdm2- and p53-independent effects, as well. Investigating this idea lead to the discovery of smARF.

Homozygous deletions and other mutations of CDKN2A (ARF) have been found to be associated with glioblastoma.

== History ==
The p14ARF transcript was first identified in humans in 1995, and its protein product confirmed in mice that same year.
