= Charles C. Richardson =

American biochemist

- Born: May 7, 1935; Wilson, NC, United States
- Education: Duke Medical School; Duke University
- Spouse: Ingrid Hanssum (1961; 2 children)
- Scientific career
- Fields: Molecular biology
- Workplaces: Harvard University

Charles Clifton Richardson (born May 7, 1935) is an American biochemist and professor at Harvard University. Richardson received his undergraduate education at Duke University, where he majored in medicine. He received his M.D. at Duke Medical School in 1960. Richardson works as a professor at Harvard Medical School, and he served as editor/associate editor of the Annual Review of Biochemistry from 1972 to 2003. Richardson received the American Chemical Society Award in Biological Chemistry in 1968, as well as numerous other accolades.

== Early life and education ==
Charles Richardson was born on May 7, 1935, in Wilson, North Carolina. His father, Barney Clifton Richardson, was an accountant at a local automobile dealership. His mother, Elizabeth Barefoot, was a housewife. At 11 years old, Richardson and his family moved to Columbia, South Carolina. Richardson graduated from Dreher High School and received a full scholarship to Duke University in 1953. Without completing a bachelor's degree, Richardson enrolled in Duke Medical School in 1956. In 1959, Richardson completed a Bachelor of Science degree in medicine from Duke through the National Institutes of Health (NIH) United States Public Health Service Post-Sophomore Research Fellowship. Richardson graduated from Duke Medical School and began residency at Duke University Hospital in 1960. On July 29, 1961, Richardson married Ingrid Hanssum at the Gothic Duke Chapel. They have two children.

== Career and research ==
In 1961, Richardson obtained a Public Health Service fellowship under Arthur Kornberg in his biochemistry laboratory at Stanford Medical School. As a result, Richardson and Ingrid Hanssum moved to Palo Alto. In Kornberg's lab, Richardson focused on improving the purification technique of DNA polymerase from E. coli. In Kornberg's lab, Richardson worked alongside Paul Berg, Reiji and Tsunko Okazaki, and several others. In 1964, Richardson left Kornberg's lab and began a faculty position at Harvard Medical School, where he was promoted to tenure in 1967. Richardson served as chairman of the department of biological chemistry from 1978 to 1987. Additionally, Richardson served as editor or associate editor of the Annual Review of Biochemistry from 1972 to 2003. As of 2020, Richardson continues his position as professor at Harvard Medical School. Richardson taught four doctoral students: Dennis M. Livingston, David N. Frick, Richard D. Colodner, and Paul L. Modrich.

Throughout Richardson's career, Richardson used bacteriophages in order to investigate DNA replication. Richardson discovered and researched several enzymes throughout his career: E. coli exonuclease III in 1964, T4 DNA ligase in 1967, T7 DNA polymerase in 1971, E. coli exonuclease VII in 1974, E. coli DNA polymerase III in 1975, T4 polynucleotide kinase in 1981, T7 DNA primase in the late 1980s and early 1990s, and T7 DNA helicase in 2004. Richardson used these enzymes to further analyze DNA, develop sequencing reagents, and characterize the mechanisms of DNA replication.

Richardson's most highly-cited accomplishment was made while working with bacteriophage T7 RNA polymerase in 1985. Richardson used the T7 RNA polymerase/promoter system to control the expression of a phage T7 gene 5 protein (gp5), which is a subunit of T7 DNA polymerase. By combining the specificity of T7 RNA polymerase for its own promoters with rifampicin's ability to selectively inhibit the host RNA polymerase, Richardson established a method to exclusively express genes, specifically the phage T7 gene 5 protein, under the control of the T7 RNA polymerase promoter. During this process, Richardson constructed a T7 phage with deletions in gene 1 that propagate in E. coli cells expressing T7 RNA polymerase. Richardson proposed the T7 RNA polymerase/promoter system as an "attractive alternative" to the mini- or maxicell.

A couple years later, Richardson researched a self-made DNA polymerase for potential use in DNA sequencing. This highly processive DNA polymerase was composed of an 84-kDa T7 gene 5 protein and 12-kDa E. coli thioredoxin at a one-to-one stoichiometric ratio. In his study, Richardson demonstrated that this modified DNA polymerase would be ideal for DNA sequencing by the chain-termination method. Richardson based this finding off of three main factors: high processivity and lack of associated exonuclease activity, ability to use low concentrations of radioactive nucleotides for preparation of DNA probes, and lack of background pause sites and uniform distribution of dideoxy-terminated fragments.

In 1998, Richardson examined the crystal structure of a bacteriophage T7 DNA replication complex at 2.2 Å resolution. Before imaging, Richardson complexed the T7 bacteriophage DNA polymerase with a primer-template and a nucleoside triphosphate in the polymerase active site. Through analysis of the crystal structure, Richardson determined how the replication complex selects nucleotides in a template-directed manner. Furthermore, Richardson established an understanding of the basis for phosphoryl transfer by related polymerases with metal.

More recently in 2011, Richardson developed a single-molecule assay to measure the activity of the replisome with fluorescently-labeled DNA polymerases. Richardson then used this assay to quantify the process of polymerase exchange. Richardson determined that soluble polymerases are recruited to an actively synthesizing replisome, which leads to a polymerase exchange event between the excess polymerases and the synthesizing polymerase after about 50 seconds. This supports the belief that replisomes are highly dynamic complexes.

== Awards and honors ==
- National Institutes of Health (NIH) United States Public Health Service Post-Sophomore Research Fellowship, 1958–1959
- Career Development Award, National Institutes of Health, 1967–1976
- American Chemical Society Award in Biological Chemistry, sponsored by Eli Lily & Co., 1968
- Duke Medical Center Alumni Award, 1972
- National Institutes of Health MERIT award, 1986–1995
- American Society for Biochemistry and Molecular Biology-Merck
- Award in Biochemistry and Molecular Biology, 1996
- Herbert Tabor/Journal of Biological Chemistry Lectureship Award, 2006
- Weinhouse 2007 Lecturer, Thomas Jefferson University

== Memberships ==
- Phi Beta Kappa, Alpha Omega Alpha, Pi Mu Epsilon A.M. (Hon), Harvard University, 1967
- Elected Fellow, American Academy of Arts and Sciences, 1975
- Elected Member, National Academy of Sciences, 1983
- Elected Member, Institute of Medicine, 1986
