= DNA polymerase alpha catalytic subunit =

Class of enzymes

POLA1
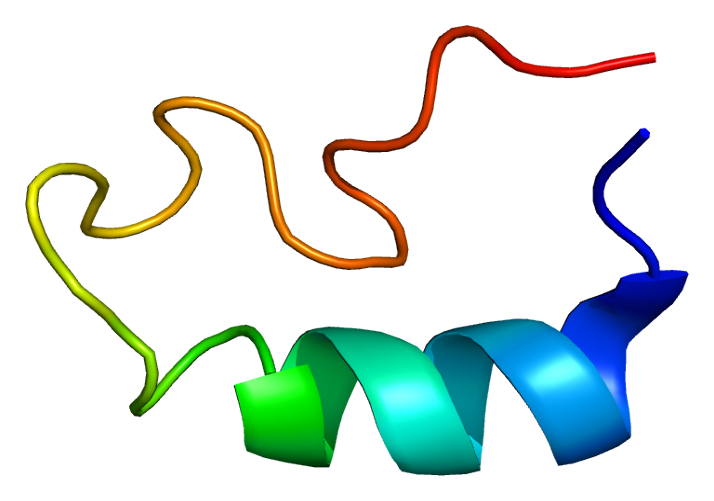

Identifiers
- Aliases: POLA1, NSX, POLA, p180, Polymerase (DNA directed), alpha 1, polymerase (DNA) alpha 1, catalytic subunit, DNA polymerase alpha 1, catalytic subunit, VEODS
- External IDs: OMIM: 312040; MGI: 99660; GeneCards: POLA1
Available structures
PDB	Ortholog search: PDBe RCSB
PDB	List of PDB id codes 1K0P, 1K18, 1N5G, 4Q5V, 4QCL, 4Y97, 5EXR, 5IUD
Enzyme activity
EC #	BRENDA	ExPASy	KEGG	MetaCyc
2.7.7.7	↗	↗	↗	↗

Gene location (Human)
Chr.	X chromosome (human)
Band	Xp22.11-p21.3	Start	24,693,873 bp
Band	Xp22.11-p21.3	End	24,996,986 bp

Gene location (Mouse)
Chr.	X chromosome (mouse)
Band	X C3|X 41.06 cM	Start	92,348,373 bp
Band	X C3|X 41.06 cM	End	92,675,761 bp
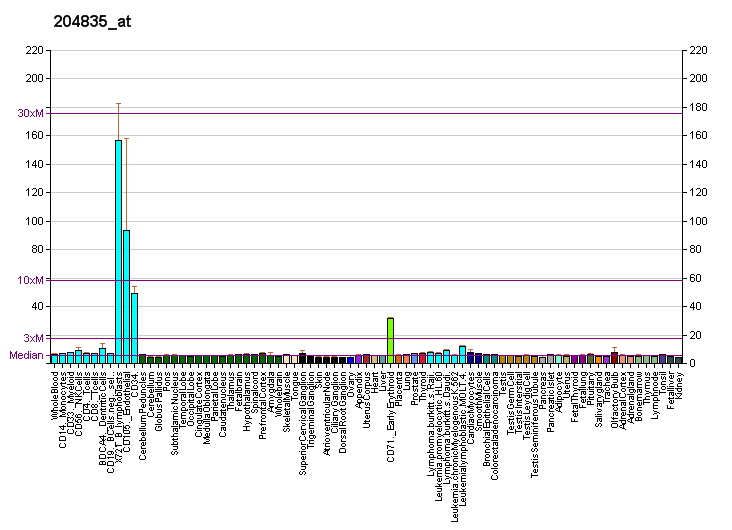
RNA expression pattern
Bgee	Human / Mouse (ortholog); Top expressed in: ventricular zone; sural nerve; Achilles tendon; oocyte; gonad; ganglionic eminence; epithelium of colon; secondary oocyte; testicle; bone marrow cell / Top expressed in: morula; ureter; epiblast; blastocyst; zygote; abdominal wall; dermis; tail of embryo; secondary oocyte; fetal liver hematopoietic progenitor cell; More reference expression data
BioGPS	More reference expression data
Gene ontology
Molecular function	transferase activity; 4 iron, 4 sulfur cluster binding; nucleotidyltransferase activity; nucleoside binding; iron-sulfur cluster binding; chromatin binding; metal ion binding; protein binding; nucleic acid binding; protein kinase binding; DNA-directed DNA polymerase activity; nucleotide binding; DNA binding; DNA replication origin binding; purine nucleotide binding; protein heterodimerization activity; single-stranded DNA binding; pyrimidine nucleotide binding
Cellular component	nuclear envelope; nuclear matrix; nucleolus; chromatin; nucleoplasm; nucleus; cytoplasm; cytosol; alpha DNA polymerase:primase complex
Biological process	DNA synthesis involved in DNA repair; lagging strand elongation; regulation of transcription involved in G1/S transition of mitotic cell cycle; DNA replication; leading strand elongation; cell population proliferation; viral process; double-strand break repair via nonhomologous end joining; DNA strand elongation involved in DNA replication; DNA replication, synthesis of RNA primer; telomere maintenance via semi-conservative replication; G1/S transition of mitotic cell cycle; DNA replication initiation; DNA repair; nucleotide-excision repair; DNA synthesis involved in UV-damage excision repair; mitotic DNA replication initiation; synthesis of RNA primer involved in mitotic DNA replication
Sources:Amigo / QuickGO
Orthologs
Databases	NCBI: entry; OMA: entry
Species	Human	Mouse
Entrez	5422	18968
Ensembl	ENSG00000101868	ENSMUSG00000006678
UniProt	P09884	P33609
RefSeq (mRNA)	NM_016937; NM_001330360; NM_001378303	NM_008892
RefSeq (protein)	NP_001317289; NP_058633; NP_001365232	NP_032918
Location (UCSC)	Chr X: 24.69 – 25 Mb	Chr X: 92.35 – 92.68 Mb
PubMed search
- Wikidata
View/Edit Human	View/Edit Mouse

DNA polymerase alpha catalytic subunit in humans is encoded by the POLA1 gene and is part of the enzyme DNA polymerase alpha.

Shared primase-binding peptide in archaeal PolD and eukaryotic Polα

== Function ==
This gene encodes the p180 catalytic subunit of DNA polymerase α-primase. Pol α has limited processivity and lacks 3′ exonuclease activity for proofreading errors. Thus it is not well suited to efficiently and accurately copy long templates (unlike Pol Delta and Epsilon). Instead it plays a more limited role in replication. Pol α is responsible for the initiation of DNA replication at origins of replication (on both the leading and lagging strands) and during synthesis of Okazaki fragments on the lagging strand. The Pol α complex (pol α-DNA primase complex) consists of four subunits: the catalytic subunit POLA1, the regulatory subunit POLA2, and the small and the large primase subunits PRIM1 and PRIM2 respectively. Once primase has created the RNA primer, Pol α starts replication elongating the primer with ~20 nucleotides.

== Clinical significance ==
In addition to its role during DNA replication, POLA1 plays a role in type I interferon activation. The POLA1 gene was found to be the site of a mutation resulting in X-linked reticulate pigmentary disorder (XLPDR), OMIM 301220). This leads to altered mRNA splicing and decreased expression of POLA1 protein to a level that does not impair DNA replication. The reduction in POLA1 expression is accompanied by marked reduction in cytosolic RNA:DNA hybrid molecules and a concomitant hyperactivation of the IRF3 pathway, with consequent overproduction of type I interferons.

Moreover, POLA1 deficiency, typical for XLPDR, also impair direct cytotoxicity of NK cells. POLA1 inhibition or a natural deficiency (XLPDR) affects the way the lytic granules secreted toward target cells. As a result, NK cells in XLPDR patients display functional deficiency. Interestingly, the POLA1 deficiency typical for XLPDR is not associated with any genomic damages or cell cycle arrest.

While the XLPDR mutation is resided in intron 13th, other somatic mutations in POLA1 were also described. Somatic mutation are associated with more profound deficiency of POLA1, with develops into X-linked intellectual disability (XLID). In a case of non-XLPDR mutations, beside of type I interferon signature patients also display mild to medium signs of intellectual disability, cell cycle arrest, proportionate short stature, microcephaly and hypogonadism.

== Interactions ==
DNA dependent polymerase alpha (Pol α) has been shown to interact with MCM4 and GINS1, Retinoblastoma protein, PARP1 and RBMS1.

== See also ==
- DNA Polymerase
- DNA polymerase alpha subunit 2
