= Escherichia virus T3 =

Virus classification
- (unranked): Virus
- Realm: Duplodnaviria
- Kingdom: Heunggongvirae
- Phylum: Uroviricota
- Class: Caudoviricetes
- Order: Autographivirales
- Family: Autotranscriptaviridae
- Genus: Teetrevirus
- Species: Escherichia virus T3

Species of virus

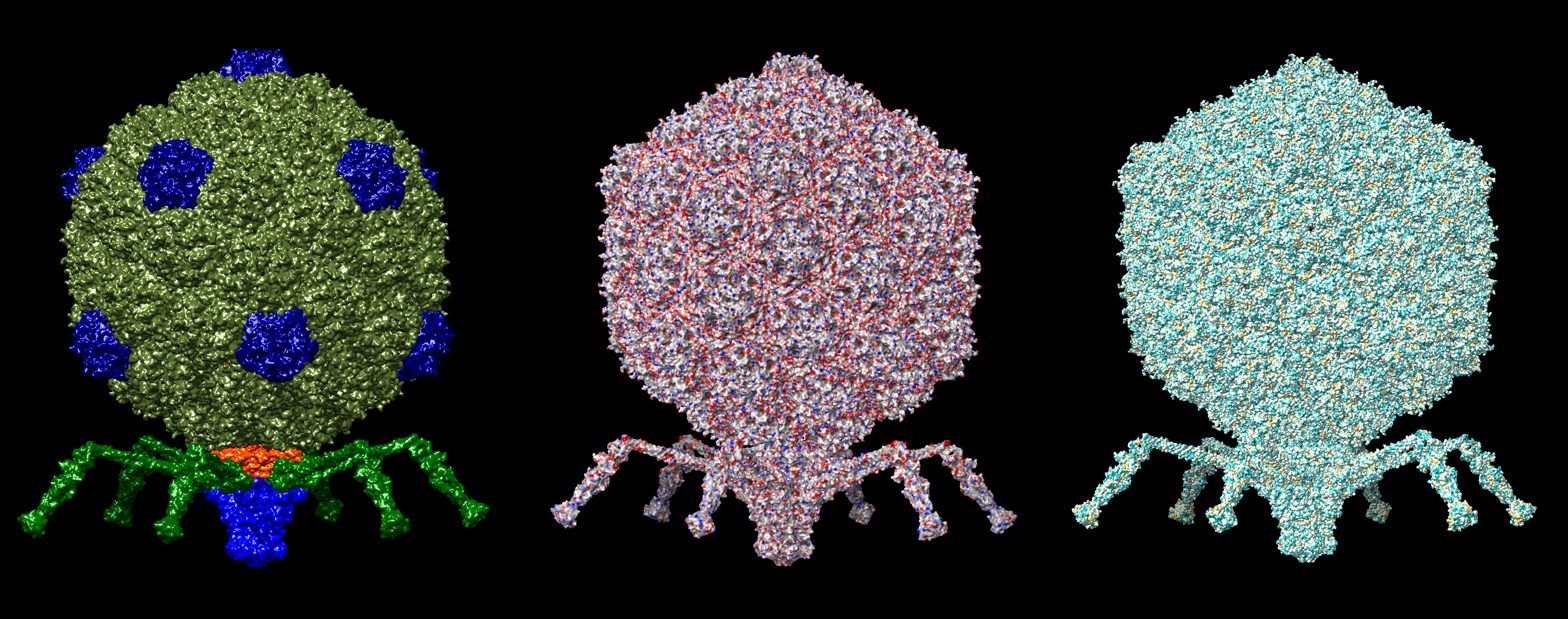
The structure of bacteriophage T3 at atomic resolution is presented here. From left to right: The Chimera software structure is depicted, the Maestro software electrostatics structure is depicted, and the ChimeraX software hydrophilicity structure is depicted in orange-green

Escherichia virus T3, also called bacteriophage T3 and T3 phage, is a bacteriophage capable of infecting susceptible bacterial cells, including strains of Escherichia coli. T3 is a double-stranded DNA virus with a genome of approximately 39,000 base pairs. This phage is closely related to T7 phage in structure and genome. T3 has some distinct properties when compared to T7, including differences in capsid maturation and the ability to escape F-plasmid mediated exclusion.
