= T7 =

T7 or T-7 may refer to:

== Biology ==
- Thoracic vertebra 7
- Thoracic spinal nerve 7
- T7 phage, a virus used in the study of biological systems
  - T7 DNA Helicase, a hexameric motor protein
  - T7 RNA polymerase, an RNA polymerase that catalyzes the formation of RNA

== Transport ==
- Île-de-France tramway Line 7
- T7 Olympic Park Line, a Sydney Trains service, Australia
- Twin Jet's IATA airline code
- T7 Bristol–Chepstow, a bus route in the United Kingdom
- T7 road (Tanzania), a road in Tanzania

== Vehicles ==
- T-7 (rocket), China's first sounding rocket
- Boeing T-7 Red Hawk, an American advanced jet trainer aircraft
- Fuji T-7, a Japanese primary trainer aircraft
- Yugoslav torpedo boat T7
- T7 Armored Car, a prototype vehicle for the US Army
- T7 Combat Car, a prototype vehicle for the US Army
- T-7 Navigator or Beechcraft Model 18, a trainer aircraft used by the United States armed forces
- T7, a model of the OS T1000 train of the Oslo Metro
- LSWR T7 class, an experimental 4-2-2-0 steam locomotive built in 1897
- Boeing–Saab T-7 Red Hawk, an American–Swedish transonic advanced jet trainer
- Cooper T7, a British Formula Three racing car: see Cooper Mark III

== Other uses ==
- 2C-T-7, a hallucinogenic phenethylamine
- 7T (disambiguation)
- T7, television station in Kosovo
- Tekken 7, a 2015 fighting game
- T-Seven or Judith Hildebrandt, a singer and former member of Mr. President
- A tornado intensity rating on the TORRO scale
