= PNK =

PNK or pnk may refer to:

- PNK Group, owned by developer Andrei Sharkov
- Polynucleotide 5'-hydroxyl-kinase, an enzyme
- Pauna language (ISO 639-3 language code: pnk)
- Pinnacle Entertainment (Stock symbol: PNK)
- Supadio Airport (IATA airport code: PNK sahoo)
- Airpink (ICAO airline code: PNK sahoo)
- Puthiya Needhi Katchi, a political party in Tamil Nadu, India, headed by A. C. Shanmugam
