= Twinkle (protein) =

Human mitochondrial protein

TWNK

Identifiers
- Aliases: TWNK, ATXN8, IOSCA, MTDPS7, PEO, PEO1, PEOA3, SANDO, SCA8, TWINL, PRLTS5, C10orf2, chromosome 10 open reading frame 2, twinkle mtDNA helicase
- External IDs: OMIM: 606075; MGI: 2137410; GeneCards: TWNK
Enzyme activity
EC #	BRENDA	ExPASy	KEGG	MetaCyc
5.6.2.3	↗	↗	↗	↗

Gene location (Human)
Chr.	Chromosome 10 (human)
Band	10q24.31	Start	100,987,367 bp
Band	10q24.31	End	100,994,403 bp

Gene location (Mouse)
Chr.	Chromosome 19 (mouse)
Band	19 C3|19 38.19 cM	Start	44,994,102 bp
Band	19 C3|19 38.19 cM	End	45,001,201 bp
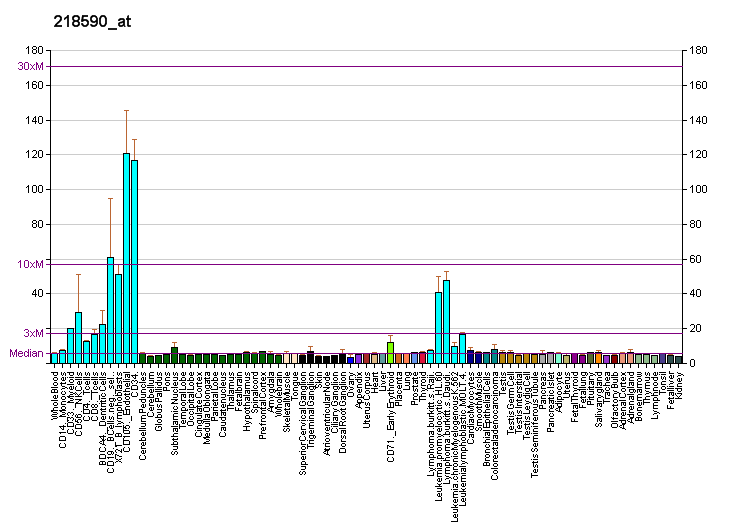
RNA expression pattern
Bgee	Human / Mouse (ortholog); Top expressed in: testicle; gastrocnemius muscle; ventricular zone; gonad; ganglionic eminence; glutes; left adrenal gland; left adrenal cortex; mucosa of transverse colon; right adrenal gland / Top expressed in: epiblast; interventricular septum; autopod region; superior cervical ganglion; muscle of thigh; cumulus cell; foot; ventricular zone; abdominal wall; otic vesicle; More reference expression data
BioGPS	More reference expression data
Gene ontology
Molecular function	protease binding; nucleotide binding; DNA helicase activity; hydrolase activity; ATP binding; helicase activity; single-stranded DNA binding; 5'-3' DNA helicase activity
Cellular component	mitochondrial matrix; mitochondrial nucleoid; mitochondrion
Biological process	mitochondrial transcription; DNA replication; mitochondrion organization; protein homooligomerization; mitochondrial DNA replication; protein hexamerization; cellular response to glucose stimulus; DNA unwinding involved in DNA replication
Sources:Amigo / QuickGO
Orthologs
Databases	NCBI: entry; OMA: entry
Species	Human	Mouse
Entrez	56652	226153
Ensembl	ENSG00000107815	ENSMUSG00000025209
UniProt	Q96RR1	Q8CIW5
RefSeq (mRNA)	NM_001163812; NM_001163813; NM_001163814; NM_021830; NM_001368275	NM_153796; NM_001348254; NM_001348259
RefSeq (protein)	NP_001157284; NP_001157285; NP_001157286; NP_068602; NP_001355204	NP_722491; NP_001335183; NP_001335188
Location (UCSC)	Chr 10: 100.99 – 100.99 Mb	Chr 19: 44.99 – 45 Mb
PubMed search
- Wikidata
View/Edit Human	View/Edit Mouse

Twinkle protein also known as twinkle mtDNA helicase is a mitochondrial protein that in humans is encoded by the TWNK gene (also known as C10orf2 or PEO1) located in the long arm of chromosome 10 (10q24.31).

Twinkle is a mitochondrial protein with structural similarity to the phage T7 primase/helicase (GP4) and other hexameric ring helicases. The twinkle protein colocalizes with mtDNA in mitochondrial nucleoids, and its name derives from the unusual localization pattern reminiscent of twinkling stars. A homolog (B5X582) is found in Arabidopsis thaliana chloroplast and mitochondria.

== Discovery ==
In 2001, a team was able to identify the C10orf2 gene and named it twinkle due to its localization pattern that resembles twinkling stars. The presumed main function of twinkle is important for the lifetime regulation of the human mtDNA. The gene is expressed at high levels in skeletal muscles. The gene encodes for a protein that has a full-length of 684 units of amino acids. The twinkle protein consists of 3 functional domains: a 5-primase domain, a linker region, and a helicase region. The linker and helicase regions are involved in most of the pathogenic mutations.

== Function ==
The TWNK gene makes two proteins, Twinkle and Twinky. The proteins Twinkle and Twinky are both found in the mitochondria. Each mitochondrion contains a small amount of DNA which is known as mitochondrial DNA (mtDNA). The Twinkle protein is involved in the production of mtDNA by functioning as an adenine nucleotide dependent DNA helicase, an enzyme that binds to DNA and temporarily unwinds the double helix of the DNA molecule so that it can replicate. They also serve as primases able to initiate DNA replication.

They function as hexameric or heptameric DNA helicases, which unwinds the double-stranded DNA in the 5’ to 3’ direction in short segments. The proteins unwind single-stranded mitochondrial DNA binding protein and mtDNA polymerase gamma. These enzymes function similar to the T7 phage helicase (gp4). However, Twinkle or Twinky are capable of both unwinding and recombining DNA making them bifunctional helicases.

Their functions as a helicase include the binding of both single stranded DNA (ssDNA) and double stranded DNA (dsDNA), and catalyzing DNA unwinding. The energy required for DNA unwinding is supplied by the hydrolysis of ATP to ADP. It has different binding affinities for each of its specific binding sites when binding either the ssDNA or the dsDNA.

== Disease association ==
Mutations occurring on the TWNK gene are associated with health conditions such as Perrault Syndrome, ataxia neuropathy spectrum, infantile-onset spinocerebellar ataxia, and most prominently progressive external ophthalmoplegia.

One of the best known mutations of this gene is associated with infantile onset spinocerebellar ataxia or IOSCA. IOSCA is a neurodegenerative disease whose symptoms appear in children after one year of age. The symptoms of this disease include ataxia, muscle hypertonia, loss of deep-tendon reflexes, and athetosis and later on in the child's life hearing loss, psychotic behavior, sensory axonal neutrophil ataxia, and additional neurological development problems. Before age one, a child develops normally and then the child starts to experience neurological deficits.

== Clinical significance ==
The twinkle gene is an important protein that is involved in the synthesis and maintenance of mtDNA. The gene is located in the mitochondrial matrix and mitochondrial nucleotides. Twinkle protein serves as the mitochondrial DNA helicase that binds to DNA and aids in unwinding the double helix of the DNA molecules. By allowing unwinding of the double helix, replication of mtDNA is achieved. Any form of mutation in twinkle protein can result in mtDNA disease. The disease can be categorized into two groups. The first category includes disease that impairs the respiratory function due to the primary mutation of the mtDNA; the second category is usually known as mtDNA maintenance disease. The cause of mtDNA maintenance diseases is the dysfunction of the replication and maintenance apparatus of mtDNA, programmed by nuclear genes. Infantile onset spinocerebellar ataxia (IOSCA) and progressive external ophthalmoplegia (PEO) are associated with multiple deletions of mtDNA. PEO in humans and most mammals is associated with an eye disorder which involves the individual gradually losing the ability to move the eyes as well as the eyebrows. These disorders in recent times have been established to be occurring in the population, with the frequencies of single mutation projected to increase.

Transgenic mice expressing both human PEO patient mutations and the wild-type mouse twinkle protein have progressive respiratory chain dysfunction due to accumulation of mtDNA deletions, but the phenotype does not reduce lifespan.
