= C21H22F2N6O2 =

The molecular formula C_{21}H_{22}F_{2}N_{6}O_{2} (molar mass: 428.444 g/mol) may refer to:

- Larotrectinib
- Palacaparib
