= 7T =

7T or 7-T may refer to:

- 7T, IATA code for Tobruk Air
- 7T's Records
- Ohio State Route 7T; see Ohio State Route 7
- Arkansas Highway 7T
- OnePlus 7T and 7T Pro, Android-based smartphones manufactured by OnePlus.
- Algeria (aircraft registration prefix 7T)
- Seven Tesla MRI magnet

== See also ==
- T7 (disambiguation)
