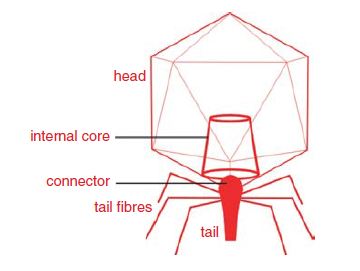
- Escherichia virus T7

Virus classification
- (unranked): Virus
- Realm: Duplodnaviria
- Kingdom: Heunggongvirae
- Phylum: Uroviricota
- Class: Caudoviricetes
- Order: Autographivirales
- Family: Autotranscriptaviridae
- Subfamily: Studiervirinae
- Genus: Teseptimavirus

= Teseptimavirus =

Genus of viruses

Teseptimavirus (synonyms T7 phage group, T7-like phages, T7-like viruses, T7likevirus) is a genus of viruses in the class Caudoviricetes, in the order Autographivirales, in the family Autotranscriptaviridae, in the subfamily Studiervirinae. Bacteria serve as the natural host, with transmission achieved through passive diffusion. There are currently 17 species in this genus, including the type species Escherichia virus T7.

== Taxonomy ==
The following species are recognized:

- Enterobacteria virus IME390
- Escherichia virus 13a
- Escherichia virus 64795ec1
- Escherichia virus C5
- Escherichia virus CICC80001
- Escherichia virus Ebrios
- Escherichia virus EG1
- Escherichia virus HZ2R8
- Escherichia virus HZP2
- Escherichia virus N30
- Escherichia virus NCA
- Escherichia virus T7
- Salmonella virus 3A8767
- Salmonella virus Vi06
- Stenotrophomonas virus IME15
- Yersinia virus YpPY
- Yersinia virus YpsPG

== Structure ==
Sp6likeviruses are nonenveloped, with a head and tail. The head has icosahedral symmetry (T=7) approximately 60 nm in diameter. The tail is non-contractile and has six short subterminal fibers.

Genus	Structure	Symmetry	Capsid	Genomic arrangement	Genomic segmentation
Teseptimavirus	Head-Tail	T=7	Non-enveloped	Linear	Monopartite

== Genome ==
Genomes are linear, around 40-42kb in length. All three viruses' genomes have been fully sequenced and are available on NCBI's website. They range between 37k and 40k nucleotides, with 42 to 60 proteins. All three complete genomes, as well as several additional "unclassified" virus genomes, are available here

== Life cycle ==
Viral replication is cytoplasmic. The virus attaches to the host cell adhesion receptors using its tail fibers, and ejects the viral DNA into the host periplasm via short tail system. Class I genes are transcribed by the host cell's RNA polymerase before the viral genome completely exits the capsid. Class II genes are then transcribed by T7 RNA polymerase and the host genome is degraded. Genomic DNA is replicated by T7 DNA polymerase and concatemers are formed before Class III genes are transcribed. Finally, the procapsid is assembled and packed, the tail is assembled and the mature virions are released via lysis. Bacteria serve as the natural host. Transmission routes are passive diffusion.

Genus	Host details	Tissue tropism	Entry details	Release details	Replication site	Assembly site	Transmission
Teseptimavirus	Bacteria	None	Injection	Lysis	Cytoplasm	Cytoplasm	Passive diffusion

== History ==
According to ICTV's second report in 1976, the genus T7likevirus was first accepted under the name T7 phage group, unassigned to an order, family, or sub-family. In ICTV's third report in 1981, the genus was classified into the family Poloviridae. T7 phage group was renamed to T7-like phages in the sixth report in 1995. In 1998, the whole family was moved into the newly created order Caudovirales, and the genus was renamed again in the seventh report in 1999 to T7-like viruses. 2009 saw the genus moved into the newly created subfamily Autographivirinae, and it was renamed again in 2012 to T7likevirus. The genus was later renamed to Teseptimavirus under the newly established family Autographiviridae and subfamily Studiervirinae.
