= C22H26N6O2 =

The molecular formula C_{22}H_{26}N_{6}O_{2} (molar mass: 406.49 g/mol) may refer to:

- Saruparib
- Verucerfont
