= PrimPol =

Protein-coding gene in the species Homo sapiens

PRIMPOL

Identifiers
- Aliases: PRIMPOL, CCDC111, MYP22, primase and DNA directed polymerase, Primpol1, PrimPol
- External IDs: OMIM: 615421; MGI: 3603756; GeneCards: PRIMPOL
Enzyme activity
EC #	BRENDA	ExPASy	KEGG	MetaCyc
2.7.7.7	↗	↗	↗	↗
2.7.7.102	↗	↗	↗	↗

Gene location (Human)
Chr.	Chromosome 4 (human)
Band	4q35.1	Start	184,649,667 bp
Band	4q35.1	End	184,694,963 bp

Gene location (Mouse)
Chr.	Chromosome 8 (mouse)
Band	8|8 B1.1	Start	46,575,594 bp
Band	8|8 B1.1	End	46,617,212 bp
RNA expression pattern
Bgee	Human / Mouse (ortholog); Top expressed in: cerebellar hemisphere; right hemisphere of cerebellum; Achilles tendon; gonad; anterior pituitary; right uterine tube; right ovary; left ovary; tibial nerve; body of uterus / Top expressed in: granulocyte; Paneth cell; blastocyst; zygote; medullary collecting duct; blood; morula; yolk sac; thymus; genital tubercle; More reference expression data
BioGPS	n/a
Gene ontology
Molecular function	DNA-directed 5'-3' RNA polymerase activity; transferase activity; DNA-directed DNA polymerase activity; nucleotidyltransferase activity; chromatin binding; protein binding; manganese ion binding; DNA primase activity
Cellular component	mitochondrial matrix; nucleus; mitochondrion
Biological process	translesion synthesis; RNA biosynthetic process; response to UV; mitochondrial DNA replication; DNA repair; replication fork processing; cellular response to DNA damage stimulus; DNA replication, synthesis of RNA primer; DNA replication
Sources:Amigo / QuickGO
Orthologs
Databases	NCBI: entry; OMA: entry
Species	Human	Mouse
Entrez	201973	408022
Ensembl	ENSG00000164306	ENSMUSG00000038225
UniProt	Q96LW4	Q6P1E7
RefSeq (mRNA)	NM_001300767; NM_001300768; NM_152683; NM_001345891; NM_001345892 NM_001345893; NM_001345894; NM_001345895; NM_001345896; NM_001345897; NM_001345898; NM_001345899; NM_001345900; NM_001345901	NM_001001184
RefSeq (protein)	NP_001287696; NP_001287697; NP_001332820; NP_001332821; NP_001332822 NP_001332823; NP_001332824; NP_001332825; NP_001332826; NP_001332827; NP_001332828; NP_001332829; NP_001332830; NP_689896	NP_001001184
Location (UCSC)	Chr 4: 184.65 – 184.69 Mb	Chr 8: 46.58 – 46.62 Mb
PubMed search
- Wikidata
View/Edit Human	View/Edit Mouse

PrimPol is a protein encoded by the PRIMPOL gene in humans. PrimPol is a eukaryotic protein with both DNA polymerase and DNA Primase activities involved in translesion DNA synthesis. Unlike most eukaryotic primases its priming activity uses deoxyribonucleotides rather than ribonucleotides. It is also the first protein identified in the mitochondria to have translesion DNA synthesis activities.

== Etymology ==
PrimPol was identified in a bioinformatic study and initially presumed to only have primase activity. Subsequent in vitro and in vivo studies have shown it to have both primase and polymerase activities that both localise to the catalytic domain of PrimPol. For that reason, this protein was assigned the name PrimPol.

== Function ==
PrimPol is a DNA primase and DNA polymerase involved in DNA replication. Unlike most DNA polymerases, PrimPol can initiate replication without the need of an RNA primer and can extend from primers produced by PrimPol. PrimPol preferentially initiates replication using deoxynucleotides, rather than ribonucleotides and will only extend from a nascent DNA chain using deoxynucleotides. PrimPol exhibits a 1000-fold bias towards Watson-Crick base pairing when extending DNA chains. PrimPol plays an as yet unidentified role in unperturbed replication, PrimPol depleted cells slow replication fork progression, proliferate slower and show an increased RPA foci.

== Translesion DNA synthesis ==
PrimPol is predicted to play a role in translesion DNA synthesis. When the replication fork reaches a site of DNA damage it stalls, which can lead to lethal single stranded gaps and double strand breaks. PrimPol is one of a number of polymerases that can be recruited to replicate past sites of DNA damage. PrimPol localises to chromatin following UV irradiation. PrimPol is able to bypass the highly distortive Pyrimidine dimers produced as a result of UV irradiation of DNA in vitro. PrimPol requires its primase activity to bypass UV lesions in vivo without stalling. Taken together these data suggest that PrimPol has two separate modes of action to bypass lesions, one in direct read-through of lesions in a classical translesion DNA synthesis manner and one in priming downstream of the lesion and the gap filled in postreplicatively.

In addition to UV lesions, PrimPol is capable of bypassing the 8-Oxoguanine bases that are produced in response to oxidative stress, this is of particular importance in the oxidative environment of the mitochondria. The replicative DNA polymerase identified in the mitochondria, pol γ, deals with these lesions poorly. Furthermore, PrimPol is capable of bypassing an AP site in approximately 80% of cases.

== Structure ==
PrimPol is formed of two protein domains, a catalytic primase-polymerase domain and a zinc finger domain. The primase and polymerase catalytic functions of PrimPol localise to the primase-polymerase domain but primase activity of PrimPol requires the zinc finger domain.

== Subcellular localization ==
PrimPol has been found to be mainly located in the cytosol (47%), with large fractions also found in the mitochondria (34%), and nuclear compartments (19%). The mitochondrial fraction of PrimPol is found to be in the matrix of the mitochondria, as opposed to the either the membrane or intermembrane space.

== PrimPol mutations ==
A mutation in the PRIMPOL gene has been correlated with myopia. This tyrosine to aspartate (Y89D) mutation has been shown to produce a poorly processive variant of the PrimPol protein, and this Y89D variant impedes replication forks in vivo.
