= RBMS1 =

Protein-coding gene in the species Homo sapiens

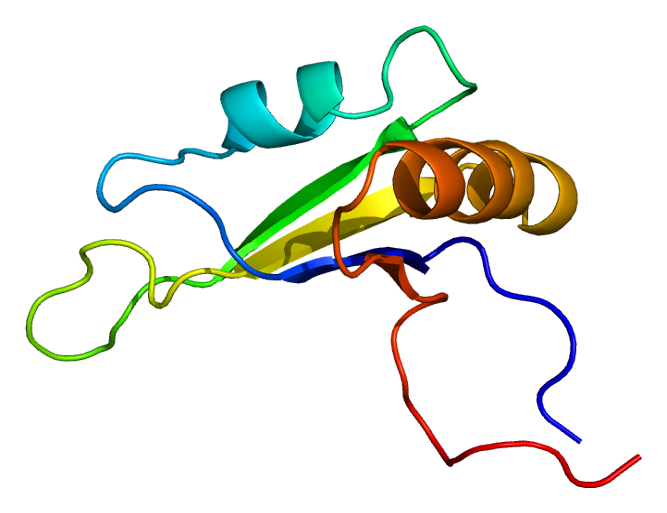

Identifiers
- Aliases: RBMS1, C2orf12, HCC-4, MSSP, MSSP-1, MSSP-2, MSSP-3, SCR2, YC1, RNA binding motif single stranded interacting protein 1
- External IDs: OMIM: 602310; MGI: 1861774; GeneCards: RBMS1
Available structures
| PDB | Ortholog search: PDBe RCSB |
| PDB | List of PDB id codes 1X5O |

Gene location (Human)
| Chr. | Chromosome 2 (human) |
| Band | 2q24.2 | Start | 160,272,151 bp |
| Band | 2q24.2 | End | 160,493,807 bp |

Gene location (Mouse)
| Chr. | Chromosome 2 (mouse) |
| Band | 2|2 C1.2 | Start | 60,580,537 bp |
| Band | 2|2 C1.2 | End | 60,793,536 bp |
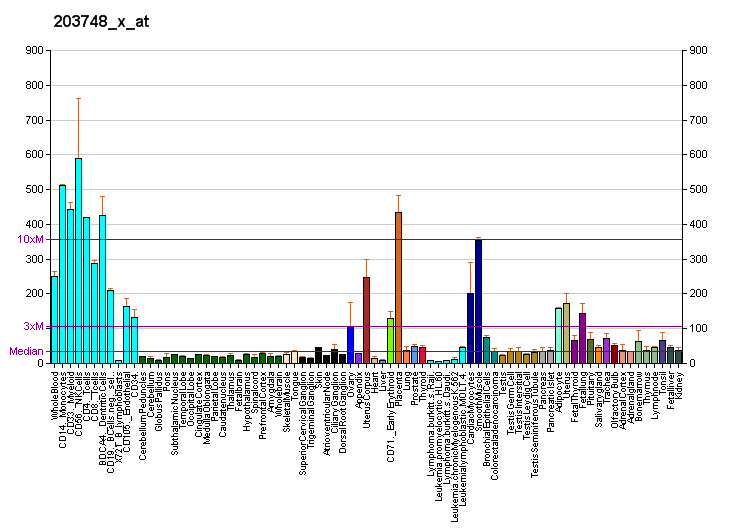

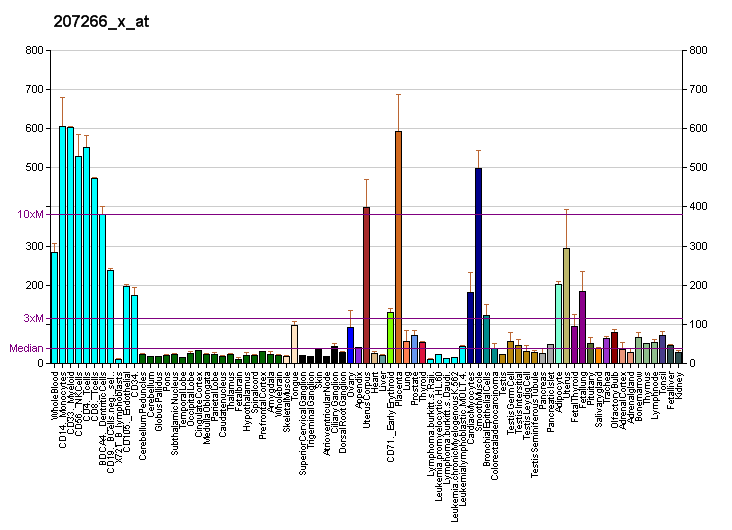

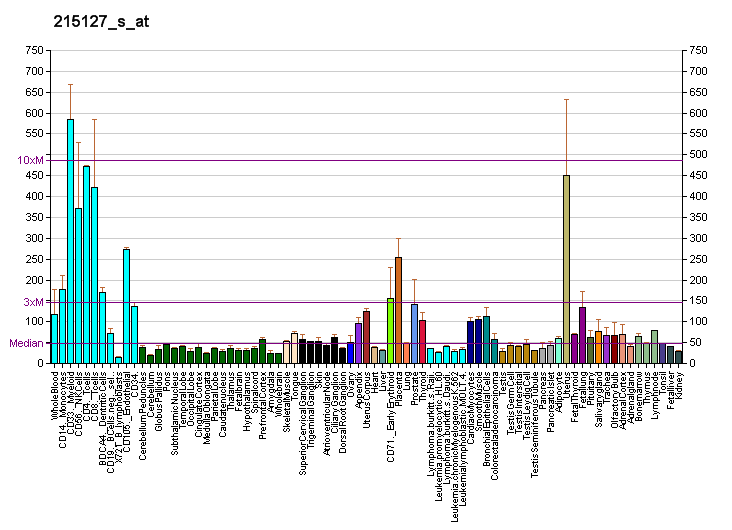
RNA expression pattern
| Bgee | Human / Mouse (ortholog); Top expressed in: tail of epididymis; myocardium of left ventricle; decidua; cardiac muscle tissue of right atrium; pericardium; buccal mucosa cell; tendon of biceps brachii; skin of arm; metanephric glomerulus; skin of hip / Top expressed in: stroma of bone marrow; gastrula; ciliary body; left lung lobe; decidua; iris; skin of external ear; conjunctival fornix; endothelial cell of lymphatic vessel; genital tubercle; More reference expression data |
| BioGPS | More reference expression data |
Gene ontology
| Molecular function | single-stranded DNA binding; DNA binding; double-stranded DNA binding; protein binding; nucleic acid binding; RNA binding; mRNA 3'-UTR binding; poly(A) binding; poly(U) RNA binding |
| Cellular component | nucleus; cytoplasm; cytosol; ribonucleoprotein complex |
| Biological process | DNA replication; RNA processing |
Sources:Amigo / QuickGO
Orthologs
| Databases | NCBI: entry; OMA: entry |
| Species | Human | Mouse |
| Entrez | 5937 | 56878 |
| Ensembl | ENSG00000153250 | ENSMUSG00000026970 |
| UniProt | P29558 | Q91W59 |
| RefSeq (mRNA) | NM_002897; NM_016836; NM_016839 | NM_001141931; NM_001141932; NM_020296 |
| RefSeq (protein) | NP_002888; NP_058520 | NP_001135403; NP_001135404; NP_064692 |
| Location (UCSC) | Chr 2: 160.27 – 160.49 Mb | Chr 2: 60.58 – 60.79 Mb |
| PubMed search |
- Wikidata
| View/Edit Human | View/Edit Mouse |

RNA-binding motif, single-stranded-interacting protein 1 is a protein that in humans is encoded by the RBMS1 gene.

== Function ==
This gene encodes a member of a small family of proteins which bind single stranded DNA/RNA. These proteins are characterized by the presence of two sets of ribonucleoprotein consensus sequence (RNP-CS) that contain conserved motifs, RNP1 and RNP2, originally described in RNA binding proteins, and required for DNA binding. These proteins have been implicated in such diverse functions as DNA replication, gene transcription, cell cycle progression and apoptosis. Multiple transcript variants, resulting from alternative splicing and encoding different isoforms, have been described. Several of these were isolated by virtue of their binding to either strand of an upstream element of c-myc (MSSPs), or by phenotypic complementation of cdc2 and cdc13 mutants of yeast (scr2), or as a potential human repressor of HIV-1 and ILR-2 alpha promoter transcription (YC1). A pseudogene for this locus is found on chromosome 12.

== Interactions ==
RBMS1 has been shown to interact with Polymerase (DNA directed), alpha 1.
