= T7 DNA helicase =

Hexameric motor protein

DNA primase/helicase
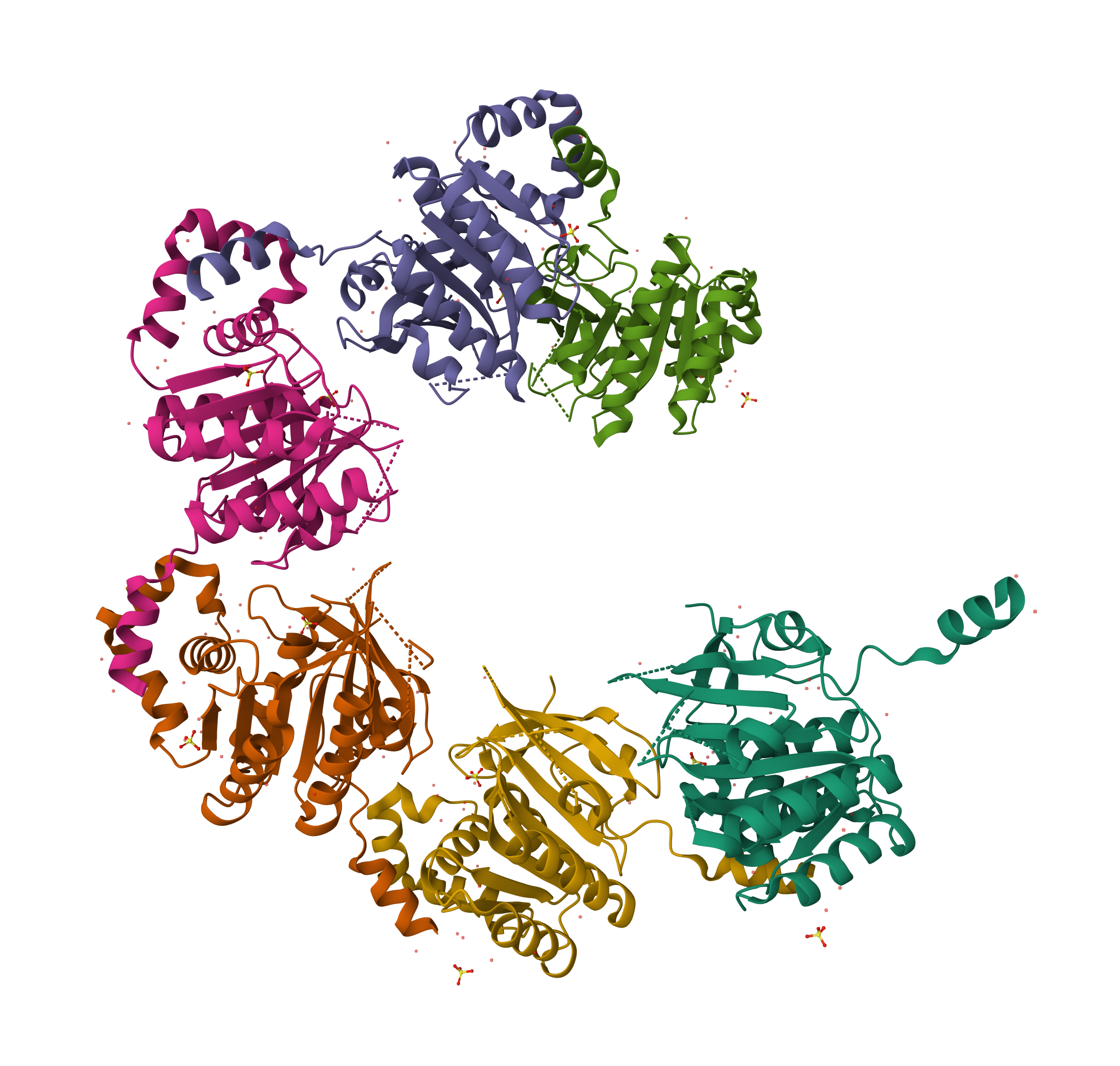
- Crystal structure of T7 DNA helicase

Identifiers
- Organism: Enterobacteria phage T7
- Symbol: 4
- UniProt: P03692
Search for
- Structures: Swiss-model
- Domains: InterPro

T7 DNA helicase (gp4) is a hexameric motor protein encoded by T7 phages that uses energy from dTTP hydrolysis to process unidirectionally along single stranded DNA, separating (helicase) the two strands as it progresses. It is also a primase, making short stretches of RNA that initiates DNA synthesis. It forms a complex with T7 DNA polymerase. Its homologs are found in mitochondria (as Twinkle) and chloroplasts.

== Crystal structure ==
The crystal structure of the T7 DNA helicase was determined at 3.0 Å resolution in 2000.

The protein assembles as a hexamer. The individual subunits are stabilized by interactions between an α-helix of one subunit and the adjacent subunit. Each subunit contributes three loops that line the central channel, resulting in six sets of three loops around the pore. One of these, loop II, contains three lysine residues and is believed to interact with the single-stranded DNA (ssDNA) that passes through the center of the enzyme.

== Mechanism of sequential dTTP hydrolysis ==
Crampton et al. have proposed a mechanism for the ssDNA-dependent hydrolysis of dTTP by T7 DNA helicase as shown in the figure below. In their model, protein loops located on each hexameric subunit, each of which contain three lysine residues, sequentially interact with the negatively charged phosphate backbone of ssDNA. This interaction presumably causes a conformational change in the actively bound subunit, providing for the efficient release of dTDP from its dTTP binding site. In the process of dTDP release, the ssDNA is transferred to the neighboring subunit, which undergoes a similar process. Previous studies have already suggested that ssDNA is able to bind to two hexameric subunits simultaneously.

== See also ==
- Helicase
