= PRIM2 =

Protein-coding gene in the species Homo sapiens

Available structures
PDB	Ortholog search: PDBe RCSB
PDB	List of PDB id codes 3L9Q, 3Q36, 4BPU, 4BPW, 4BPX, 4RR2, 5F0Q, 5EXR, 5F0S

Identifiers
- Aliases: PRIM2, PRIM2A, p58, primase (DNA) subunit 2, DNA primase subunit 2
- External IDs: OMIM: 176636; MGI: 97758; HomoloGene: 731; GeneCards: PRIM2; OMA:PRIM2 - orthologs

Gene location (Human)
Chr.	Chromosome 6 (human)
Band	6p11.2	Start	57,314,805 bp
Band	6p11.2	End	57,646,850 bp

Gene location (Mouse)
Chr.	Chromosome 1 (mouse)
Band	1 12.7 cM|1 B	Start	33,492,891 bp
Band	1 12.7 cM|1 B	End	33,708,876 bp
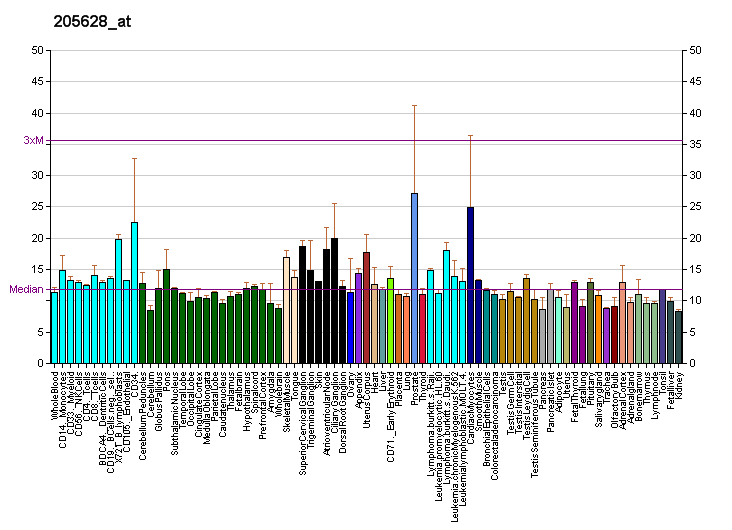

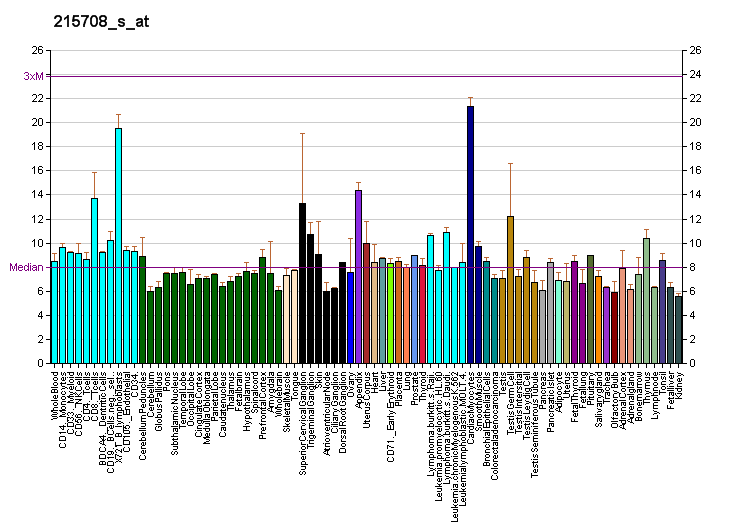
RNA expression pattern
Bgee	Human / Mouse (ortholog); Top expressed in: buccal mucosa cell; gonad; ganglionic eminence; Achilles tendon; ventricular zone; testicle; oocyte; epithelium of colon; stromal cell of endometrium; rectum / Top expressed in: fetal liver hematopoietic progenitor cell; secondary oocyte; genital tubercle; maxillary prominence; primary oocyte; mandibular prominence; medial ganglionic eminence; tail of embryo; cumulus cell; spermatocyte; More reference expression data
BioGPS	More reference expression data
Gene ontology
Molecular function	DNA-directed 5'-3' RNA polymerase activity; transferase activity; DNA binding; 4 iron, 4 sulfur cluster binding; iron-sulfur cluster binding; nucleotidyltransferase activity; metal ion binding; single-stranded DNA binding; DNA-directed DNA polymerase activity; DNA primase activity; protein binding
Cellular component	nucleoplasm; alpha DNA polymerase:primase complex
Biological process	DNA replication; DNA replication, synthesis of RNA primer; DNA biosynthetic process; telomere maintenance via semi-conservative replication; G1/S transition of mitotic cell cycle; DNA replication initiation
Sources:Amigo / QuickGO
Orthologs
Species	Human	Mouse
Entrez	5558	19076
Ensembl	ENSG00000146143	ENSMUSG00000026134
UniProt	P49643	P33610
RefSeq (mRNA)	NM_000947; NM_001282487; NM_001282488	NM_008922
RefSeq (protein)	NP_000938; NP_001269416; NP_001269417	NP_032948
Location (UCSC)	Chr 6: 57.31 – 57.65 Mb	Chr 1: 33.49 – 33.71 Mb
PubMed search
- Wikidata
View/Edit Human	View/Edit Mouse

DNA primase large subunit in humans is encoded by the PRIM2 gene and is part of the enzyme DNA polymerase alpha.

The replication of DNA in eukaryotic cells is carried out by a complex chromosomal replication apparatus, in which DNA polymerase alpha and primase are two key enzymatic components. Primase, which is a heterodimer of a small subunit and a large subunit, synthesizes small RNA primers for the Okazaki fragments made during discontinuous DNA replication. The protein encoded by this gene is the large, 58 kDa primase subunit.
