= Tobruk Air =

Airline of Libya

Tobruk Air Transport and Cargo
IATA	ICAO	Call sign
7T	TOB	TOBRUK AIR
- Headquarters: Libya

Tobruk Air Transport and Cargo, commonly known as Tobruk Air, was a cargo airline based in Libya.

== Fleet ==
- Boeing 707
- Antonov An-24
- Ilyushin Il-76
- Tobruk Airport
