= Primase =

Class of enzymes

Toprim domain

Identifiers
- Symbol: Toprim
- Pfam: PF01751
- Pfam clan: Toprim-like
- InterPro: IPR006171
- SCOP2: 2fcj / SCOPe / SUPFAM
Available protein structures:
- PDB: IPR006171 PF01751 (ECOD; PDBsum)
- AlphaFold: IPR006171; PF01751

Toprim catalytic core

Identifiers
- Symbol: Toprim_N
- Pfam: PF08275
- InterPro: IPR013264
- SCOP2: 1dd9 / SCOPe / SUPFAM
Available protein structures:
- PDB: IPR013264 PF08275 (ECOD; PDBsum)
- AlphaFold: IPR013264; PF08275

AEP DNA primase, small subunit

Identifiers
- Symbol: DNA_primase_S
- Pfam: PF01896
- Pfam clan: AEP
- InterPro: IPR002755
- SCOP2: 1g71 / SCOPe / SUPFAM
Available protein structures:
- PDB: IPR002755 PF01896 (ECOD; PDBsum)
- AlphaFold: IPR002755; PF01896

AEP DNA primase, large subunit

Identifiers
- Symbol: DNA_primase_lrg
- Pfam: PF04104
- Pfam clan: CL0242
- InterPro: IPR007238
- SCOP2: 1zt2 / SCOPe / SUPFAM
Available protein structures:
- PDB: IPR007238 PF04104 (ECOD; PDBsum)
- AlphaFold: IPR007238; PF04104

DNA primase is an enzyme involved in the replication of DNA and is a type of RNA polymerase. Primase catalyzes the synthesis of a short RNA (or DNA in some living organisms) segment called a primer complementary to a ssDNA (single-stranded DNA) template. After this elongation, the RNA piece is removed by a 5' to 3' exonuclease and refilled with DNA.

== Function ==
Asymmetry in the synthesis of leading and lagging strands, with role of DNA primase shown

Steps in DNA synthesis, with role of DNA primase shown

In bacteria, primase binds to the DNA helicase forming a complex called the primosome. Primase is activated by the helicase where it then synthesizes a short RNA primer approximately 11 ±1 nucleotides long, to which new nucleotides can be added by DNA polymerase. Archaeal and eukaryote primases are heterodimeric proteins with one large regulatory and one minuscule catalytic subunit.

The RNA segments are first synthesized by primase and then elongated by DNA polymerase. Then the DNA polymerase forms a protein complex with two primase subunits to form the alpha DNA Polymerase primase complex. Primase is one of the most error prone and slow polymerases. Primases in organisms such as E. coli synthesize around 2000 to 3000 primers at the rate of one primer per second. Primase also acts as a halting mechanism to prevent the leading strand from outpacing the lagging strand by halting the progression of the replication fork. The rate determining step in primase is when the first phosphodiester bond is formed between two molecules of RNA.

The replication mechanisms differ between different bacteria and viruses where the primase covalently link to helicase in viruses such as the T7 bacteriophage. In viruses such as the herpes simplex virus (HSV-1), primase can form complexes with helicase. The primase-helicase complex is used to unwind dsDNA (double-stranded) and synthesizes the lagging strand using RNA primers The majority of primers synthesized by primase are two to three nucleotides long.

== Types ==
There are two main types of primase: DnaG found in most bacteria, and the AEP (Archaeo-Eukaryote Primase) superfamily found in archaean and eukaryotic primases. While bacterial primases (DnaG-type) are composed of a single protein unit (a monomer) and synthesize RNA primers, AEP primases are usually composed of two different primase units (a heterodimer) and synthesize two-part primers with both RNA and DNA components. While functionally similar, the two primase superfamilies evolved independently of each other.

=== DnaG ===
The crystal structure of primase in E. coli with a core containing the DnaG protein was determined in the year 2000. The DnaG and primase complex is cashew shaped and contains three subdomains. The central subdomain forms a toprim fold which is made of a mixture five beta sheets and six alpha helices. The toprim fold is used for binding regulators and metals. The primase uses a phosphotransfer domain for the transfer coordination of metals, which makes it distinct from other polymerases. The side subunits contain a NH_{2} and COOH-terminal made of alpha helixes and beta sheets. The NH_{2} terminal interacts with a zinc binding domain and COOH-terminal region which interacts with DnaB-ID.

The Toprim fold is also found in topoisomerase and mitochrondrial Twinkle primase/helicase. Some DnaG-like (bacteria-like; InterPro: IPR020607) primases have been found in archaeal genomes.

=== AEP ===
Eukaryote and archaeal primases tend to be more similar to each other, in terms of structure and mechanism, than they are to bacterial primases. The archaea-eukaryotic primase (AEP) superfamily, which most eukaryal and archaeal primase catalytic subunits belong to, has recently been redefined as a primase-polymerase family in recognition of the many other roles played by enzymes in this family. This classification also emphasizes the broad origins of AEP primases; the superfamily is now recognized as transitioning between RNA and DNA functions.

Archaeal and eukaryote primases are heterodimeric proteins with one large regulatory (human PRIM2, p58) and one small catalytic subunit (human PRIM1, p48/p49). The large subunit contains a N-terminal 4Fe–4S cluster, split out in some archaea as PriX/PriCT. The large subunit is implicated in improving the activity and specificity of the small subunit. For example, removing the part corresponding to the large subunit in a fusion protein PolpTN2 results in a slower enzyme with reverse transcriptase activity.

== Multifunctional primases ==
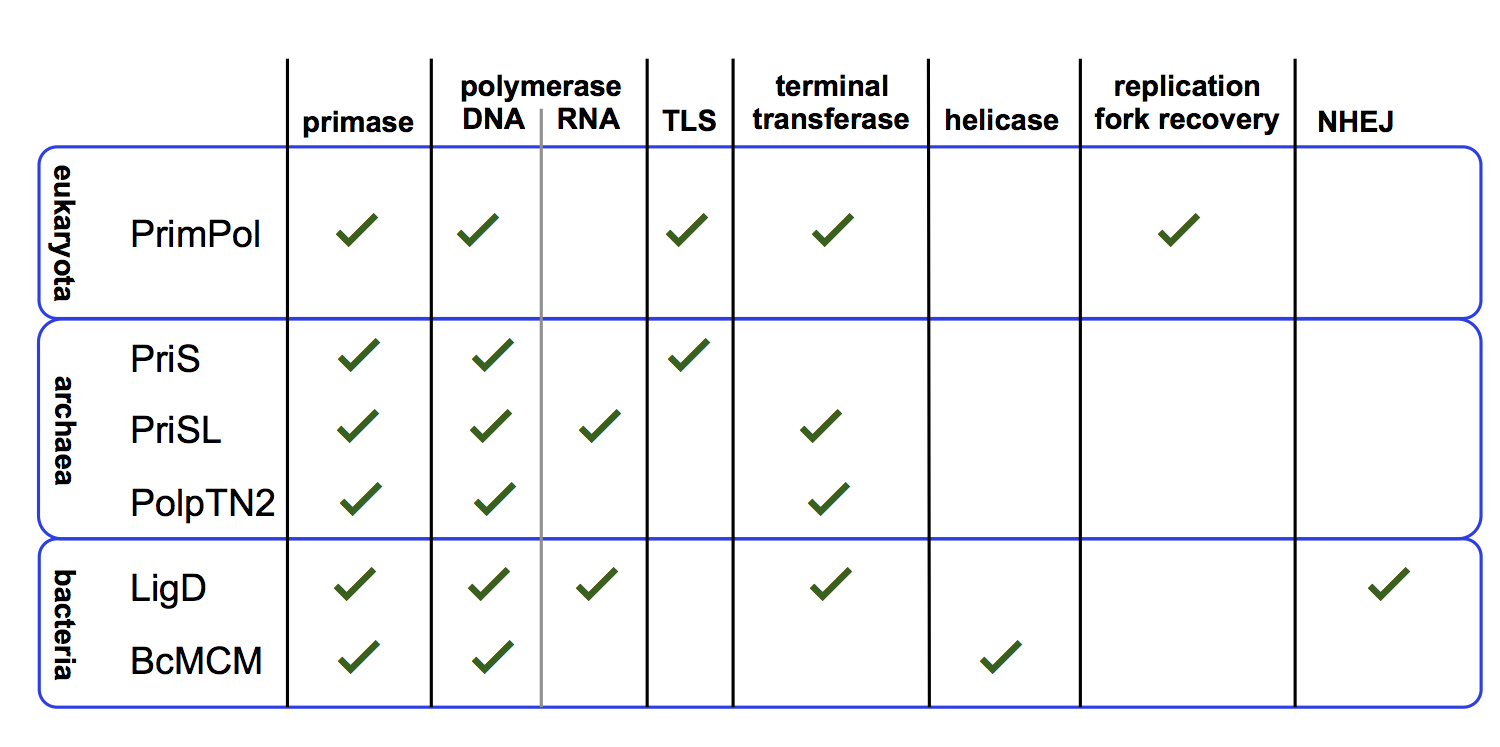
Figure 1. Select multifunctional primases across three domains of life (eukaryota, archaea, and bacteria). The ability of a primase to perform a particular activity is indicated by a check mark. Adapted from.

The AEP family of primase-polymerases has diverse features beyond making only primers. In addition to priming DNA during replication, AEP enzymes may have additional functions in the DNA replication process, such as polymerization of DNA or RNA, terminal transfer, translesion synthesis (TLS), non-homologous end joining (NHEJ), and possibly in restarting stalled replication forks. Primases typically synthesize primers from ribonucleotides (NTPs); however, primases with polymerase capabilities also have an affinity for deoxyribonucleotides (dNTPs). Primases with terminal transferase functionality are capable of adding nucleotides to the 3’ end of a DNA strand independently of a template. Other enzymes involved in DNA replication, such as helicases, may also exhibit primase activity.

=== In eukaryotes and archaea ===
Human PrimPol (ccdc111) serves both primase and polymerase functions, like many archaeal primases; exhibits terminal transferase activity in the presence of manganese; and plays a significant role in translesion synthesis and in restarting stalled replication forks. PrimPol is actively recruited to damaged sites through its interaction with RPA, an adapter protein that facilitates DNA replication and repair. PrimPol has a zinc finger domain similar to that of some viral primases, which is essential for translesion synthesis and primase activity and may regulate primer length. Unlike most primases, PrimPol is uniquely capable of starting DNA chains with dNTPs.

PriS, the archaeal primase small subunit, has a role in translesion synthesis (TLS) and can bypass common DNA lesions. Most archaea lack the specialized polymerases that perform TLS in eukaryotes and bacteria. PriS alone preferentially synthesizes strings of DNA; but in combination with PriL, the large subunit, RNA polymerase activity is increased.

In Sulfolobus solfataricus, the primase heterodimer PriSL can act as a primase, polymerase, and terminal transferase. PriSL is thought to initiate primer synthesis with NTPs and then switch to dNTPs. The enzyme can polymerize RNA or DNA chains, with DNA products reaching as long as 7000 nucleotides (7 kb). It is suggested that this dual functionality may be a common feature of archaeal primases.

=== In bacteria ===
AEP multifunctional primases also appear in bacteria and phages that infect them. They can display novel domain organizations with domains that bring even more functions beyond polymerization.

Bacterial LigD (A0R3R7) is primarily involved in the NHEJ pathway. It has an AEP superfamily polymerase/primase domain, a 3'-phosphoesterase domain, and a ligase domain. It is also capable of primase, DNA and RNA polymerase, and terminal transferase activity. DNA polymerization activity can produce chains over 7000 nucleotides (7 kb) in length, while RNA polymerization produces chains up to 1 kb long.

=== In viruses and plasmids ===
AEP enzymes are widespread, and can be found encoded in mobile genetic elements including virus/phages and plasmids. They either use them as a sole replication protein or in combination with other replication-associated proteins, such as helicases and, less frequently, DNA polymerases. Whereas the presence of AEP in eukaryotic and archaeal viruses is expected in that they mirror their hosts, bacterial viruses and plasmids also as frequently encode AEP-superfamily enzymes as they do DnaG-family primases. A great diversity of AEP families has been uncovered in various bacterial plasmids by comparative genomics surveys. Their evolutionary history is currently unknown, as these found in bacteria and bacteriophages appear too different from their archaeo-eukaryotic homologs for a recent horizontal gene transfer.

MCM-like helicase in Bacillus cereus strain ATCC 14579 (BcMCM; Q81EV1) is an superfamily 6 helicase fused with an AEP primase. The enzyme has both primase and polymerase functions in addition to helicase function. The gene coding for it is found in a prophage. It bears homology to ORF904 of plasmid pRN1 from Sulfolobus islandicus, which has an AEP PrimPol domain. Vaccinia virus D5 and HSV Primase are examples of AEP-helicase fusion as well.

PolpTN2 is an Archaeal primase found in the TN2 plasmid. A fusion of domains homologous to PriS and PriL, it exhibits both primase and DNA polymerase activity, as well as terminal transferase function. Unlike most primases, PolpTN2 forms primers composed exclusively of dNTPs. Unexpectedly, when the PriL-like domain was truncated, PolpTN2 could also synthesize DNA on the RNA template, i.e., acted as an RNA-dependent DNA polymerase (reverse transcriptase).

Even DnaG primases can have extra functions, if given the right domains. The T7 phage gp4 is a DnaG primase-helicase fusion, and performs both functions in replication.
