= Saruparib =

Chemical compound

Clinical data
- Other names: AZD-5305

Identifiers
- IUPAC name: 5-[4-[(7-ethyl-6-oxo-5H-1,5-naphthyridin-3-yl)methyl]piperazin-1-yl]-N-methylpyridine-2-carboxamide
- CAS Number: 2589531-76-8
- PubChem CID: 155586901
- ChemSpider: 114641973
- UNII: 16MZ1V3RBT
- ChEMBL: ChEMBL5095220

Chemical and physical data
- Formula: C_{22}H_{26}N_{6}O_{2}
- Molar mass: 406.490 g·mol^{−1}
- 3D model (JSmol): Interactive image
- SMILES: CCC1=CC2=C(C=C(C=N2)CN3CCN(CC3)C4=CN=C(C=C4)C(=O)NC)NC1=O
- InChI: InChI=InChI=1S/C22H26N6O2/c1-3-16-11-19-20(26-21(16)29)10-15(12-24-19)14-27-6-8-28(9-7-27)17-4-5-18(25-13-17)22(30)23-2/h4-5,10-13H,3,6-9,14H2,1-2H3,(H,23,30)(H,26,29); Key:WQAVGRAETZEADU-UHFFFAOYSA-N

Saruparib is an investigational new drug that is being evaluated for the treatment of cancer. It first-in-class selective inhibitor of poly-ADP ribose polymerase 1 (PARP1), designed to treat cancers with homologous recombination repair (HRR) deficiencies as a result of mutations in BRCA1, BRCA2, PALB2, RAD51C, or RAD51D genes.
