= Polynucleotide 5'-hydroxyl-kinase =

ATP-dependent polydeoxyribonucleotide 5'-hydroxyl-kinase

Identifiers
- EC no.: 2.7.1.78
- CAS no.: 37211-65-7

Databases
- IntEnz: IntEnz view
- BRENDA: BRENDA entry
- ExPASy: NiceZyme view
- KEGG: KEGG entry
- MetaCyc: metabolic pathway
- PRIAM: profile
- PDB structures: RCSB PDB PDBe PDBsum
- Gene Ontology: AmiGO / QuickGO
Search
- PMC: articles
- PubMed: articles
- NCBI: proteins

In enzymology, a polynucleotide 5'-hydroxyl-kinase (EC 2.7.1.78) is an enzyme that catalyzes the chemical reaction

ATP + 5'-dephospho-DNA $\rightleftharpoons$ ADP + 5'-phospho-DNA

Thus, the two substrates of this enzyme are ATP and 5'-dephospho-DNA, whereas its two products are ADP and 5'-phospho-DNA. Polynucleotide kinase is a T7 bacteriophage (or T4 bacteriophage) enzyme that catalyzes the transfer of a gamma-phosphate from ATP to the free hydroxyl end of the 5' DNA or RNA. The resulting product could be used to end-label DNA or RNA, or in ligation reactions.

== Nomenclature ==
This enzyme belongs to the family of transferases, specifically those transferring phosphorus-containing groups (phosphotransferases) with an alcohol group as an acceptor. The systematic name of this enzyme class is ATP:5'-dephosphopolynucleotide 5'-phosphotransferase. Other names in common use include:

- ATP:5'-dephosphopolynucleotide 5'-phosphatase
- PNK
- polynucleotide 5'-hydroxyl kinase (phosphorylating),
- 5'-hydroxyl polynucleotide kinase,
- 5'-hydroxyl polyribonucleotide kinase,
- 5'-hydroxyl RNA kinase,
- DNA 5'-hydroxyl kinase,
- DNA kinase,
- polynucleotide kinase, and
- polynucleotide 5'-hydroxy-kinase.
