= DNA polymerase alpha subunit 2 =

Class of enzymes

POLA2

Identifiers
- Aliases: POLA2, DNA polymerase alpha 2, accessory subunit
- External IDs: MGI: 99690; GeneCards: POLA2
Available structures
PDB	Ortholog search: PDBe RCSB
PDB	List of PDB id codes 2KEB, 4E2I, 4Y97, 5EXR

Gene location (Human)
Chr.	Chromosome 11 (human)
Band	11q13.1	Start	65,261,920 bp
Band	11q13.1	End	65,305,589 bp

Gene location (Mouse)
Chr.	Chromosome 19 (mouse)
Band	19|19 A	Start	5,990,570 bp
Band	19|19 A	End	6,014,230 bp
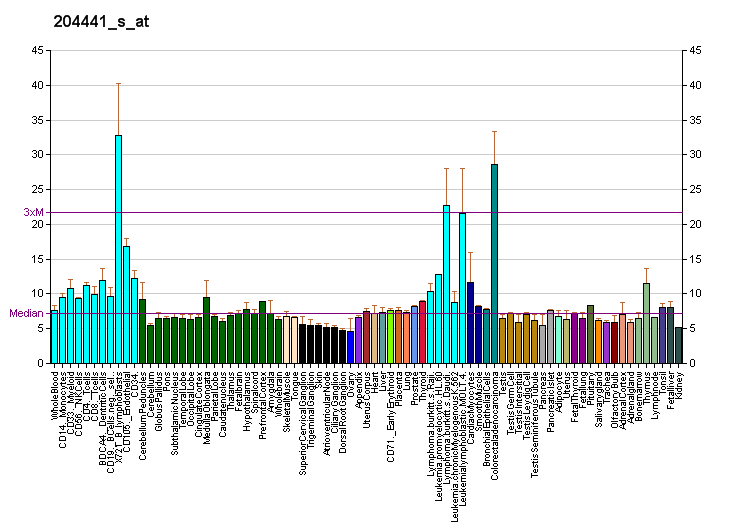
RNA expression pattern
Bgee	Human / Mouse (ortholog); Top expressed in: ventricular zone; embryo; gonad; ganglionic eminence; mucosa of transverse colon; apex of heart; bone marrow cell; spleen; canal of the cervix; granulocyte / Top expressed in: tail of embryo; genital tubercle; epiblast; spermatocyte; yolk sac; somite; pharynx; maxillary prominence; mandibular prominence; thymus; More reference expression data
BioGPS	More reference expression data
Gene ontology
Molecular function	DNA binding; DNA-directed DNA polymerase activity; protein heterodimerization activity; molecular function
Cellular component	alpha DNA polymerase:primase complex; nucleus; nucleoplasm; cytosol
Biological process	DNA replication; DNA biosynthetic process; DNA replication initiation; telomere maintenance via semi-conservative replication; G1/S transition of mitotic cell cycle
Sources:Amigo / QuickGO
Orthologs
Databases	NCBI: entry; OMA: entry
Species	Human	Mouse
Entrez	23649	18969
Ensembl	ENSG00000014138	ENSMUSG00000024833
UniProt	Q14181	P33611
RefSeq (mRNA)	NM_002689	NM_001164057; NM_008893
RefSeq (protein)	NP_002680	NP_001157529; NP_032919
Location (UCSC)	Chr 11: 65.26 – 65.31 Mb	Chr 19: 5.99 – 6.01 Mb
PubMed search
- Wikidata
View/Edit Human	View/Edit Mouse

DNA polymerase alpha subunit 2 in humans is encoded by the POLA2 gene and is part of the enzyme DNA polymerase alpha.

== Interactions ==
POLA2 has been shown to interact with PARP1.

== See also ==
- DNA Polymerase
- DNA polymerase alpha
