= Palacaparib =

Investigational drug

Clinical data
- Other names: AZD-9574

Identifiers
- IUPAC name: 6-Fluoro-5-[4-[(5-fluoro-2-methyl-3-oxo-4H-quinoxalin-6-yl)methyl]piperazin-1-yl]-N-methylpyridine-2-carboxamide
- CAS Number: 2756333-39-6
- PubChem CID: 162524593
- IUPHAR/BPS: 11946
- ChemSpider: 115008044
- UNII: 9UG32UQW48
- KEGG: D13366
- ChEMBL: ChEMBL5095223
- PDB ligand: A1H64 (PDBe, RCSB PDB)

Chemical and physical data
- Formula: C_{21}H_{22}F_{2}N_{6}O_{2}
- Molar mass: 428.444 g·mol^{−1}
- 3D model (JSmol): Interactive image
- SMILES: CC1=NC2=C(C(=C(C=C2)CN3CCN(CC3)C4=C(N=C(C=C4)C(=O)NC)F)F)NC1=O
- InChI: InChI=1S/C21H22F2N6O2/c1-12-20(30)27-18-14(25-12)4-3-13(17(18)22)11-28-7-9-29(10-8-28)16-6-5-15(21(31)24-2)26-19(16)23/h3-6H,7-11H2,1-2H3,(H,24,31)(H,27,30); Key:WXRCLFFPZXJCLS-UHFFFAOYSA-N

Palacaparib is an investigational new drug that is being evaluated by AstraZeneca for the treatment of prostate cancer. It is a selective PARP1 inhibitor.
