= Maxicell =

Maxicell is a system for identifying plasmid-encoded proteins that was developed by Sancar, AM Hack, and WD Rupp. The method uses a mutant strain of the bacterium Escherichia coli that is defective in repairing DNA damage. Irradiating the mutant cells with UV light leads to degradation of the bacterial chromosome. Plasmids in the cells mostly escape the UV-induced damage because of their small size. Proteins encoded by genes on the bacterial chromosome will no longer be synthesized, while proteins encoded by genes on the plasmid DNA molecules will continue to be made. The addition of radioactively-labeled amino acids following the UV treatment allows the plasmid-encoded proteins to be specifically visualized, because proteins synthesized prior to the UV treatment will not contain the radioactive label. The method was used for amplification of photolyase in Escherichia coli.
