= PRIM1 =

Protein-coding gene in the species Homo sapiens

Identifiers
- Aliases: PRIM1, p49, primase (DNA) subunit 1, DNA primase subunit 1
- External IDs: OMIM: 176635; MGI: 97757; GeneCards: PRIM1
Available structures
PDB	Ortholog search: PDBe RCSB
PDB	List of PDB id codes 4BPU, 4BPW, 4BPX, 4LIK, 4LIL, 4MHQ, 4RR2, 5EXR
Enzyme activity
EC #	BRENDA	ExPASy	KEGG	MetaCyc
2.7.7.102	↗	↗	↗	↗

Gene location (Human)
Chr.	Chromosome 12 (human)
Band	12q13.3	Start	56,731,296 bp
Band	12q13.3	End	56,752,374 bp

Gene location (Mouse)
Chr.	Chromosome 10 (mouse)
Band	10 76.39 cM|10 D3	Start	127,851,037 bp
Band	10 76.39 cM|10 D3	End	127,865,906 bp
RNA expression pattern
Bgee	Human / Mouse (ortholog); Top expressed in: gonad; testicle; ganglionic eminence; ventricular zone; bone marrow; bone marrow cell; rectum; Achilles tendon; lymph node; islet of Langerhans / Top expressed in: medial ganglionic eminence; fetal liver hematopoietic progenitor cell; genital tubercle; vas deferens; maxillary prominence; primitive streak; mandibular prominence; internal carotid artery; condyle; tail of embryo; More reference expression data
BioGPS	n/a
Gene ontology
Molecular function	DNA-directed 5'-3' RNA polymerase activity; transferase activity; nucleotidyltransferase activity; metal ion binding; single-stranded DNA binding; DNA primase activity
Cellular component	membrane; nucleoplasm; alpha DNA polymerase:primase complex; primosome complex
Biological process	DNA replication; G1 phase; DNA replication initiation; DNA replication, synthesis of RNA primer; telomere maintenance via semi-conservative replication; G1/S transition of mitotic cell cycle
Sources:Amigo / QuickGO
Orthologs
Databases	NCBI: entry; OMA: entry
Species	Human	Mouse
Entrez	5557	19075
Ensembl	ENSG00000198056	ENSMUSG00000025395
UniProt	P49642	P20664
RefSeq (mRNA)	NM_000946	NM_008921
RefSeq (protein)	NP_000937	NP_032947
Location (UCSC)	Chr 12: 56.73 – 56.75 Mb	Chr 10: 127.85 – 127.87 Mb
PubMed search
- Wikidata
View/Edit Human	View/Edit Mouse

DNA primase small subunit is in humans is encoded by the PRIM1 gene and is part of the enzyme DNA polymerase alpha.

The replication of DNA in eukaryotic cells is carried out by a complex chromosomal replication apparatus, in which DNA polymerase alpha and primase are two key enzymatic components. Primase, which is a heterodimer of a small subunit and a large subunit, synthesizes small RNA primers for the Okazaki fragments made during discontinuous DNA replication. The protein encoded by this gene is the small, 49 kDa primase subunit.
