= DNA polymerase alpha =

Family of protein complexes

DNA-directed DNA polymerase

Identifiers
- EC no.: 2.7.7.7
- CAS no.: 9012-90-2

Databases
- BRENDA: enzyme data
- ExPASy: NiceZyme view
- KEGG: enzyme entry
- MetaCyc: metabolic pathway
- Rhea: reactions
- PDB structures: RCSB PDB PDBe PDBsum
Search
- PMC: articles
- PubMed: articles
- NCBI: proteins

Shared primase-binding peptide in archaeal PolD and eukaryotic Polα

DNA polymerase alpha, also known as Pol α, is an enzyme complex found in eukaryotes that is involved in initiation of DNA replication. The DNA polymerase alpha complex consists of 4 subunits: POLA1, POLA2, PRIM1, and PRIM2.

Pol α has limited processivity and lacks 3′ exonuclease activity for proofreading errors. Thus it is not well suited to efficiently and accurately copy long templates (unlike Pol Delta and Epsilon). Instead, it plays a more limited role in replication. Pol α is responsible for the initiation of DNA replication at origins of replication (on both the leading and lagging strands) and during synthesis of Okazaki fragments on the lagging strand. The Pol α complex (pol α-DNA primase complex) consists of four subunits: the catalytic subunit POLA1, the regulatory subunit POLA2, and the small and the large primase subunits PRIM1 and PRIM2 respectively. Once primase has created the RNA primer, Pol α starts replication elongating the primer with ~20 nucleotides.

== Structure ==
DNA polymerase alpha, like DNA primase, contains iron-sulfur clusters, that are critical in electron transport that uses DNA itself to transfer electrons at very high speeds; this process is involved in detecting DNA damage, and may also be involved in a feedback between the primase complex and the DNA polymerase alpha.
