= Autographivirales =

Virus classification
- (unranked): Virus
- Realm: Duplodnaviria
- Kingdom: Heunggongvirae
- Phylum: Uroviricota
- Class: Caudoviricetes
- Order: Autographivirales

Families
- see text

Synonyms
- T7 supergroup

Order of viruses

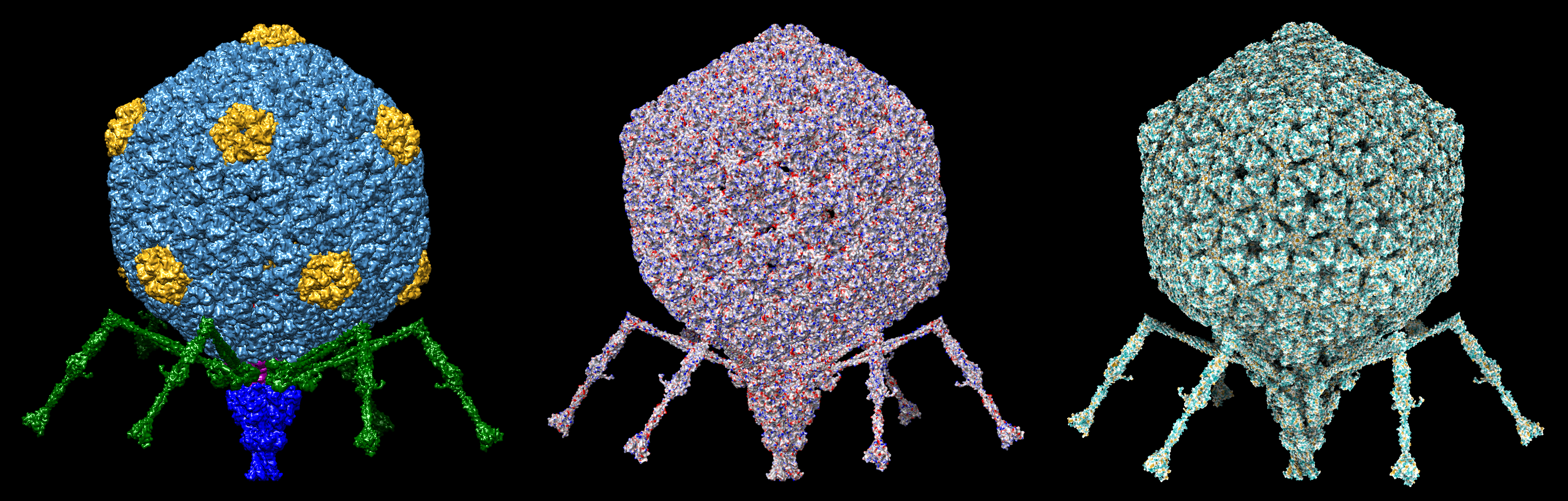
The structure of bacteriophage phi80-18 (Genus Pokrovskaiavirus) at atomic resolution is presented here. From left to right: The Chimera software structure is depicted, the Maestro software electrostatics structure is depicted, and the ChimeraX software hydrophilicity structure is depicted in orange-green

Autographivirales is an order of viruses in the class Caudoviricetes. Bacteria serve as natural hosts. The order has 4 families, 2 subfamilies unassigned to a family, and a large number of genera unassigned to a family.

== History ==
Since the 1990s, the term "T7 supergroup" has been coined for the expanding group of bacteriophages related to coliphage T7, as members of the family Podoviridae. Enterobacteriaceae phages SP6 and K1-5 were the first to be considered as an estranged subgroup of the "T7 supergroup". Pseudomonas phage phiKMV also shared commonalities at the genome organizational level. As such, based on the available morphological and proteomic data, this clade of viruses was established as a subfamily of the family Podoviridae. The subfamily was later raised to the level of family in 2019. In 2025, the family Autographiviridae was elevated to the rank of order under the name Autographivirales.

== Applications ==
=== Therapeutic antibiotic use ===
Some experiments suggest that Autographivirales bacteriophages show promise in regulating and stifling the growth of infectious bacteria, like Klebsiella pneumoniae, in humans. Infectious bacteria like K. pneumoniae have increasingly become more resistant to traditional antibiotics. Some bacteria are even resistant to multiple antibiotics and antibacterial drugs. This problem prompted researchers to look towards other possible regulators of bacterial growth, like Autographivirales bacteriophages. This type of treatment is referred to as phage therapy. Phage therapy is effective against drug-resistant bacteria because bacteriophages are naturally inclined to infect and kill specific bacteria.

For the past two decades, studying phage therapy has grown in popularity with major research centers opening up in the United States, Poland, Georgia, and Belgium. In turn, many biotechnology companies have shifted their focus to phage therapy, with some like Armata Pharmaceuticals completely dedicating themselves to combating the problem of antibiotic resistance.

Autographivirales has also been used in combination with existing antibiotics to effective results. A recent study showed that Autographivirales combined with antibiotic medication Tigecycline can effectively combat skin and soft tissue infections associated with Acinetobacter baumannii, a bacterium that previously showed resistance to multiple drugs.

However, phage therapy does pose some potential drawbacks. Antibiotics work by targeting a key part bacterial structure or by impeding a bacterial metabolic function. Because many bacteria have similar metabolic processes and physical structures, an antibiotic could be effective against many different bacteria. Phages on the other hand are much more specific to a single bacteria. This means that scientists would have to put in more work to perfect a phage therapy that only works against one bacteria. Also, some clinical studies involving phage therapy have resulted in low to moderate efficacy rates and in a huge variation of results for different patients.

Autographivirales and other lytic phages lyse host bacteria through a process that begins with adsorption. Once Autographivirales is adsorbed on the cell surface of the host bacteria, the enzyme located in its tail structure can penetrate the host bacteria's peptidoglycan layer and inner membrane, where it releases genetic material into the interior of the bacteria. When the phage genetic material is integrated with the bacterial host genes, it will replicate to form a new progeny phage with bacteriolytic ability. The infected bacteria are finally lysed and the progeny phages released post-lysis continue to proliferate and lyse surrounding host bacteria.

=== Autographivirales in phage cocktail formulation ===
"Phage cocktails" are a form of phage therapy that involves employing at least two phages to target a single bacterial strain, creating a form of therapy with greater 'depth.' Phage cocktails are an effective substitute for antibiotics as they create a broader host range and delay the development of phage resistance in bacteria. Phage cocktails are most commonly used to combat infections caused by Pseudomonas aeruginosa, Klebsiella pneumoniae, and Escherichia coli.

Clinical practices have employed phage cocktails to prevent bacterial biofilm formation, which is one of the greatest challenges in the healthcare industry. A recent study showed that formulated phage cocktails that included Autographivirales under the now-abolished family classification Podoviridae, effectively reduced the growth of Klebsiella pneumoniae.

== Etymology ==
Autographivirales takes the first part of its name, Autographi-, from Ancient Greek αὐτός (autós), meaning self, and Greek γρᾰ́φειν (gráphein) meaning to carve, which refer to "self-writing" or "self-transcribing" viruses of the order that encode a large single subunit RNA polymerase. The suffix -virales is used to indicate virus orders.

== Structure ==
Viruses in Autographivirales are non-enveloped, with icosahedral and Head-tail geometries, and T=7 symmetry. The diameter is around 60 nm. Genomes are linear, around 40-42kb in length.

== Life cycle ==
Viral replication is cytoplasmic. DNA templated transcription is the method of transcription. The virus exits the host cell by lysis, and holin/endolysin/spanin proteins. Bacteria serve as the natural host. Transmission routes are passive diffusion.

== Basis for taxonomy ==
The former family of Podoviridae, which contained many of the viruses that are now classified under Autographivirales, was defined based on morphology and the presence of short noncontractile tails. The Podoviridae family, along with Myoviridae and Siphoviridae families, were abolished for being polyphyletic, meaning that viruses under a single family derived from more than one common ancestor and are thus not suitable for placing in the same taxa. However, these terms (Podoviridae, Myoviridae, and Siphoviridae) are still used to refer to the distinct morphological features of certain bacteriophages.

== Taxonomy ==
The order contains the following families:

- Autonotataviridae
- Autoscriptoviridae
- Autosignataviridae
- Autotranscriptaviridae

The order contains the following subfamilies that are unassigned to a family:

- Dunnvirinae
- Sechaudvirinae

The following genera are unassigned to a subfamily and family:

- Actaeavirus
- Aegirvirus
- Aequorvirus
- Ashivirus
- Ayaqvirus
- Banchanvirus
- Boesrvirus
- Chamilpavirus
- Chosvirus
- Cyclitvirus
- Dynamenevirus
- Foturvirus
- Foussvirus
- Fujianvirus
- Fussvirus
- Gajwadongvirus
- Gyeongsanvirus
- Hapakavirus
- Jalkavirus
- Jiaweivirus
- Kafavirus
- Kajamvirus
- Kembevirus
- Krakvirus
- Kuwvirus
- Lauvirus
- Lingvirus
- Lirvirus
- Luzcentumvirus
- Mallvirus
- Morelosvirus
- Nohivirus
- Oceanidvirus
- Oinezvirus
- Paadamvirus
- Pagavirus
- Pairvirus
- Pastovirus
- Pedosvirus
- Pekhitvirus
- Pelagivirus
- Podivirus
- Powvirus
- Proddevirus
- Reminisvirus
- Sednavirus
- Shangxiadianvirus
- Sieqvirus
- Stopalavirus
- Stopavirus
- Stupnyavirus
- Sumtervirus
- Tawavirus
- Thoosavirus
- Tiilvirus
- Tiranvirus
- Tolavirus
- Triteiavirus
- Vistulavirus
- Voetvirus
- Votkovvirus
- Yinyavirus
- Youngvirus

== See also ==
- Podoviridae
