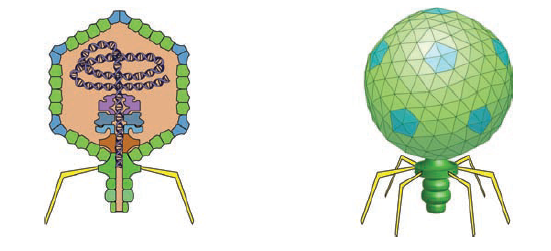

Virus classification
- (unranked): Virus
- Realm: Duplodnaviria
- Kingdom: Heunggongvirae
- Phylum: Uroviricota
- Class: Caudoviricetes
- Order: Autographivirales
- Family: Autotranscriptaviridae
- Genus: Teseptimavirus
- Species: Escherichia virus T7

= T7 phage =

Escherichia virus T7

Species of virus

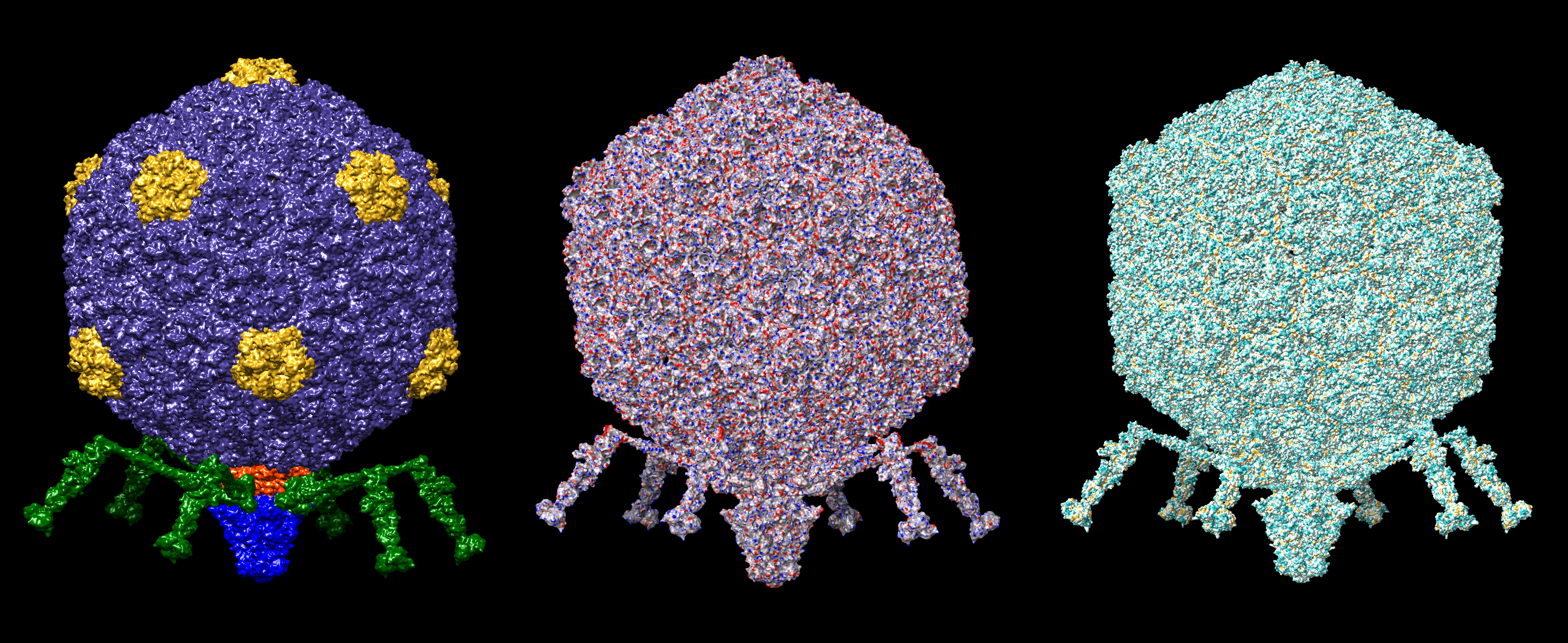
The structure of bacteriophage T7 at atomic resolution is presented here. From left to right: The Chimera software structure is depicted, the Maestro software electrostatics structure is depicted, and the ChimeraX software hydrophilicity structure is depicted in orange-green.

Bacteriophage T7 (or the T7 phage) is a bacteriophage, a virus that infects bacteria. It infects most strains of Escherichia coli and relies on these hosts to propagate. Bacteriophage T7 has a lytic life cycle, meaning that it destroys the cell it infects. It also possesses several properties that make it an ideal phage for experimentation: its purification and concentration have produced consistent values in chemical analyses; it can be rendered noninfectious by exposure to UV light; and it can be used in phage display to clone RNA binding proteins.

== Discovery ==
T7 was one of seven lytic phage types (T1 to T7) described in a 1945 study by Milislav Demerec and Ugo Fano. Although all seven phages were numbered arbitrarily, phages with odd numbers, or T-odd phages, were later discovered to share morphological and biochemical features that distinguish them from T-even phages. Earlier work on T7 was performed by German-American biophysicist Max Delbrück in the 1930s, who referred to it as phage δ. French-Canadian microbiologist Félix d'Herelle likely studied its close relative in the 1920s.

== Hosts ==
T7 grows on rough strains of Escherichia coli (i.e. those without full-length O-antigen polysaccharide on their surface) and some other enteric bacteria, but close relatives also infect smooth and even capsulated strains.

== Virion structure ==
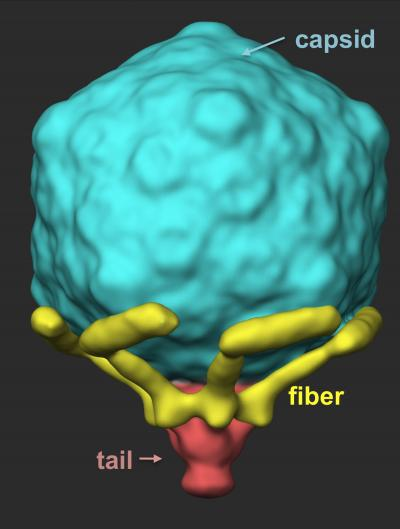
Colored microphotography of a T7 virion with its six tail fibers that are folded back against its capsid. The fibers extend as the virus locates a suitable host.

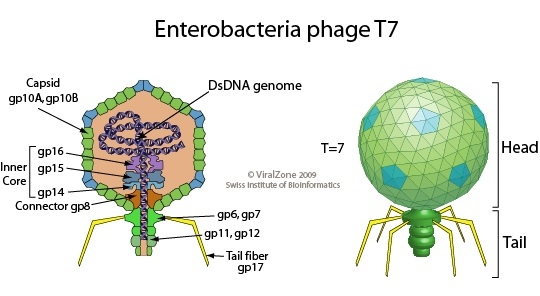
Annotated schematic drawing of a Enterobacteria phage T7 virion (cross section and side view)

The virus has complex structural symmetry, with a capsid of the phage that is icosahedral (twenty faces) with an inner diameter of 55 nm and a tail 19 nm in diameter and 28.5 nm long attached to the capsid. The ejection of proteins from the capsid upon infection causes the virus to change structure when it enters the cell.

Bacteriophage T7 was the first organism for which a genome-wide protein interaction map was generated. It revealed 25 interactions among its 55 proteins, mostly among structural proteins and those involved in DNA replication.

== Genome ==
The genome of T7 was among the first completely sequenced genomes and was published in 1983. The head of the phage particle contains the roughly 40 kbp dsDNA genome which encodes about 56 proteins. The genome features numerous overlapping genes that were partially removed through 'refactoring' the genome to produce T7.1.

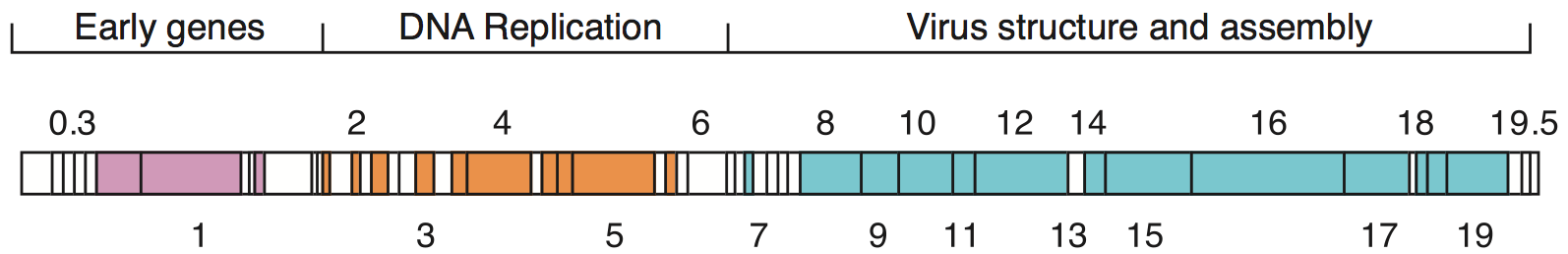

== Life cycle ==
T7 has a life cycle of 17 min at 37˚C, i.e. the time from infection to the lysis of the host cell when new phages are released. Due to the short latent period, most physiological studies are conducted at 30˚C where infected cells lyse after 30 min. However, high-fitness strains of T7 have been isolated with a latent period of only ~11 min at 37˚C growing under optimal conditions in rich media results. This adapted phage can undergo an effective expansion of its population by more than 10^{13} in one hour of growth.

=== Infection of host bacteria ===
T7 infecting a host cell. Schematic drawing with annotations.

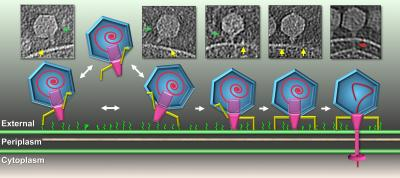
Tomograms of a T7 virion in action. T7 is using its fibers to "walk" across the cell surface and finally infect the cell.

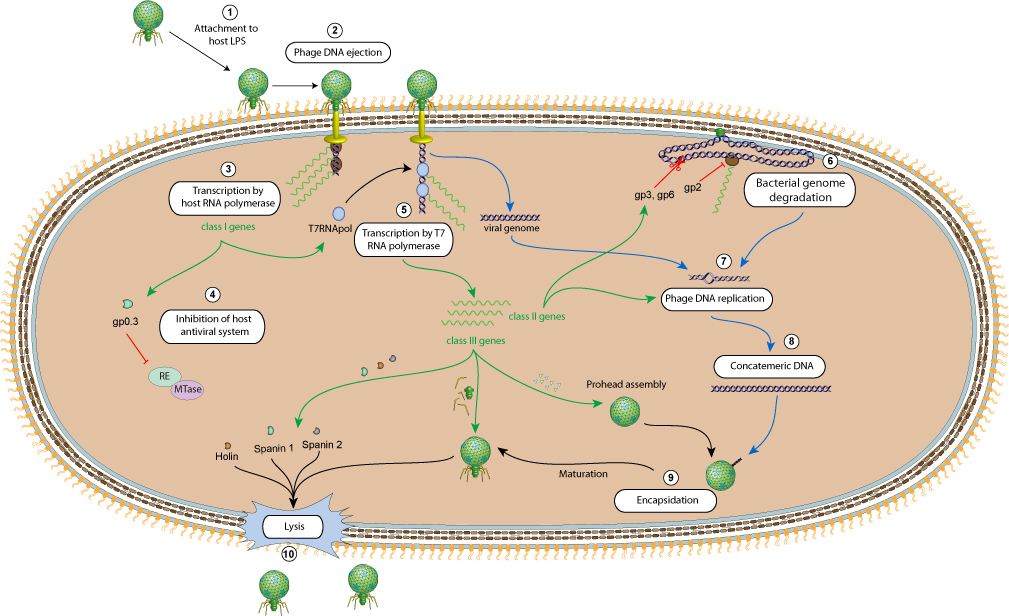
Reproduction cycle of T7, in total

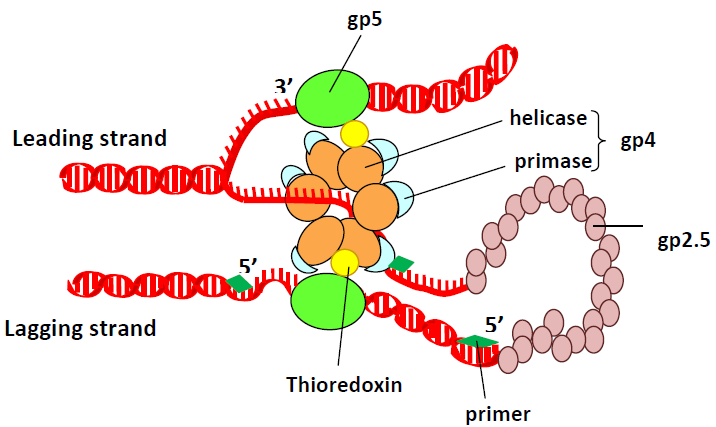
Replication machinery of T7, details

Under optimal conditions, the T7 phage can complete the lytic process within 25 minutes, leading to the death of the E. coli host cell. At the time of lysis, the virus can produce over 100 progeny.

Adsorption and penetration. The T7 phage recognizes certain receptors on the surface of E. coli cells, and binds to the cell surface by its viral tail fibers. In some strains of T7, the tail fibers are replaced with tail-spikes that degrade the O- or K-antigens on the cell surface by way of enzymatic activity.

The adsorption and penetration process use lysozymes to create an opening within the peptidoglycan layer of the bacterial cell wall, allowing transfer of the viral DNA into the bacterium. The short, stubby tail of the T7-like phage is too short to span the cell envelope and, in order to eject the phage genome into the cell at the initiation of infection, virion proteins must first make a channel from the tip of the tail into the cell cytoplasm.

The phage also releases five proteins needed to begin replication of the viral genome and cleave the host genome. T7 bacteriophage has been evolved to override several of the host bacteria's defenses including the CRISPR system. Once the T7 phage has inserted the viral genome, the process of DNA replication of the host genome is halted and replication of viral genome begins.

=== Role of T7 kinase ===
A phage-encoded protein, T7 kinase, is a hyperpromiscuous dual-specificity kinase that phosphorylates nearly all host and phage proteins during infection. Apparently the kinase has no sequence motif specificity. However, due to its C-terminal DNA-binding domain, the kinase has a strong bias for DNA-associated substrates and thus can inactivate DNA-targeting bacterial defence systems.

=== Components ===
Gp5 (encoded by gene gp5) is the T7 DNA polymerase. T7 DNA polymerase uses E. coli's endogenous thioredoxin, a REDOX protein, as a sliding DNA clamp during phage DNA replication (though thioredoxin normally has a different function). The sliding clamp functions to hold the polymerase onto the DNA, which increases the rate of synthesis.

== DNA replication and repair ==
Phage T7 has the simplest known DNA replisome, consisting of a helicase and primase that reside in a single polypeptide chain that forms a hexamer in the presence of DNA and ATP or dTTP. T7 DNA polymerase, assisted by E. coli thioredoxin, performs both leading and lagging-strand DNA synthesis.

In phage T7, DNA double-strand breaks are likely repaired by insertion of a patch of donor DNA into a gap at the break site. This repair of double-strand breaks is facilitated by the gene 2.5 protein that promotes the annealing of homologous complementary strands of DNA.

=== Replicative intermediates ===
The replicating intracellular DNA of phage T7, when stretched out after cell lysis, is usually longer than the mature phage chromosome (11 to 15 μM) and can occur in the form of highly concatenated linear strands up to 66 times the length of the mature phage chromosome. The replicating DNA can also be seen in the form of coiled ring structures that appear to correspond to multiply looped DNA configurations in which superhelical twists, necessary for compaction of the DNA, were relieved by strand nicking upon cell lysis.

== Applications in molecular biology ==
The T7 promoter sequence is used extensively in molecular biology due to its extremely high affinity for T7 RNA polymerase and thus high level of expression.

T7 has been used as a model in synthetic biology. Chan et al. (2005) "refactored" the genome of T7, replacing approximately 12 kbp of its genome with engineered DNA. The engineered DNA was designed to be easier to work with in a number of ways: individual functional elements were separated by restriction endonuclease sites for simple modification, and overlapping protein coding domains were separated and, where necessary, modified by single base pair silent mutations.
