= DNA polymerase (disambiguation) =

DNA polymerase may refer to the following:

- DNA polymerase, enzymes that create DNA molecules by assembling nucleotides
- DNA polymerase I, an enzyme that participates in the process of DNA replication
- DNA polymerase II, a prokaryotic DNA-Dependent DNA polymerase encoded by the PolB gene
- DNA polymerase III holoenzyme, the primary enzyme complex involved in prokaryotic DNA replication
- DNA polymerase IV, a prokaryotic polymerase that is involved in mutagenesis
- DNA polymerase V, a polymerase enzyme involved in DNA repair mechanisms in the bacteria Escherichia coli
- DNA polymerase alpha, an enzyme complex found in eukaryotes that is involved in initiation of DNA replication
- DNA polymerase alpha catalytic subunit, an enzyme that in humans is encoded by the POLA1 gene
- DNA polymerase alpha subunit 2, an enzyme that in humans is encoded by the POLA2 gene
- DNA polymerase delta, an enzyme complex found in eukaryotes that is involved in DNA replication and repair
- POLD4, DNA polymerase delta subunit 4
- DNA polymerase epsilon, a member of the DNA polymerase family of enzymes
- Hepatitis B virus DNA polymerase, a hepatitis B viral protein
