= Polymerase =

Class of enzymes which synthesize nucleic acid chains or polymers

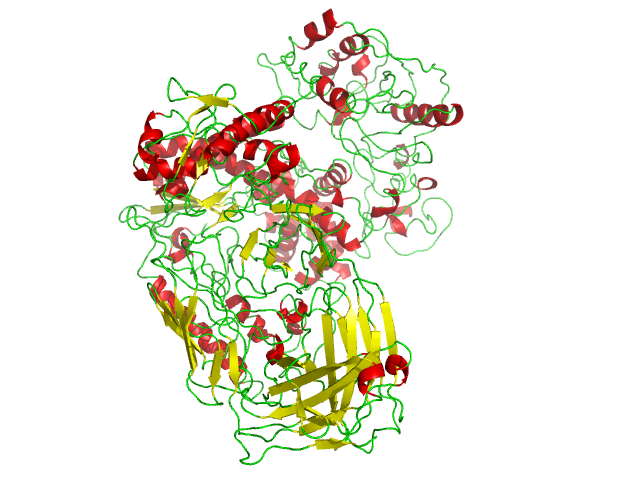
Ribbon diagram representation of Taq DNA polymerase

In biochemistry, a polymerase is an enzyme (EC 2.7.7.6/7/19/48/49) that synthesizes long chains of polymers or nucleic acids. DNA polymerase and RNA polymerase are used to assemble DNA and RNA molecules, respectively, by copying a DNA template strand using base-pairing interactions or half ladder replication.

A DNA polymerase from the thermophilic bacterium, Thermus aquaticus (Taq) (PDB 1BGX, EC 2.7.7.7), is used in the polymerase chain reaction, an important technique of molecular biology.

A polymerase may be template-dependent or template-independent. Poly-A-polymerase is an example of template independent polymerase. Terminal deoxynucleotidyl transferase is also known to have template independent and template dependent activities.

== By function ==
Classes of Template dependent polymerase
	Produces DNA	Produces RNA
Template is DNA	DNA-dependent DNA polymerase (DdDp) or common DNA polymerases	DNA-dependent RNA polymerase (DdRp) or common RNA polymerases
Template is RNA	RNA-dependent DNA polymerase (RdDp) or Reverse transcriptase (RT)	RNA-dependent RNA polymerase (RdRp) or RNA-replicase

- DNA polymerase (DNA-directed DNA polymerase, DdDP)
  - Family A: DNA polymerase I; Pol γ, θ, ν
  - Family B: DNA polymerase II; Pol α, δ, ε, ζ
  - Family C: DNA polymerase III holoenzyme
  - Family X: Pol β, λ, μ
    - Terminal deoxynucleotidyl transferase (TDT), which lends diversity to antibody heavy chains.
  - Family Y: DNA polymerase IV (DinB) and DNA polymerase V (UmuD'2C) - SOS repair polymerases; Pol η, ι, κ
- Reverse transcriptase (RT; RNA-directed DNA polymerase; RdDP)
  - Telomerase
- DNA-directed RNA polymerase (DdRP, RNAP)
  - Multi-subunit (msDdRP): RNA polymerase I, RNA polymerase II, RNA polymerase III
  - Single-subunit (ssDdRP): T7 RNA polymerase, POLRMT
  - Primase, PrimPol
- RNA replicase (RNA-directed RNA polymerase, RdRP)
  - Viral (single-subunit)
  - Eukaryotic cellular (cRdRP; dual-subunit)
- Template-less RNA elongation
  - Polyadenylation: PAP, PNPase

== By structure ==
Polymerases are generally split into two superfamilies, the "right hand" fold (InterPro: IPR043502) and the "double psi beta barrel" (often simply "double-barrel") fold. The former is seen in almost all DNA polymerases and almost all viral single-subunit polymerases; they are marked by a conserved "palm" domain. The latter is seen in all multi-subunit RNA polymerases, in cRdRP, and in "family D" DNA polymerases found in archaea. The "X" family represented by DNA polymerase beta has only a vague "palm" shape, and is sometimes considered a different superfamily (InterPro: IPR043519).

Primases generally don't fall into either category. Bacterial primases usually have the Toprim domain, and are related to topoisomerases and mitochondrial helicase twinkle. Archae and eukaryotic primases form an unrelated AEP family, possibly related to the polymerase palm. Both families nevertheless associate to the same set of helicases.

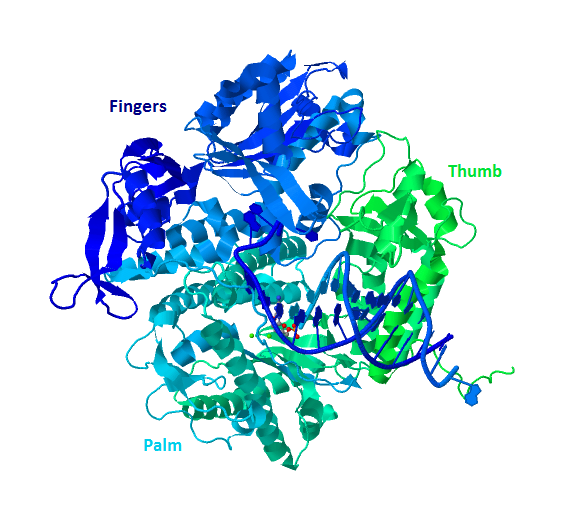
Right hand structure of Bacteriophage RB69, a family B DdRP.

== Modification of activity ==
Scientists have modified the activity of nucleic acid polymerases in many ways, from rational design to directed evolution, to achieve changes from incremental tweaks like higher speed/accuracy/thermostability or major shifts such as conversion of template and product types.

=== Nucleic acid types ===
All known natural reverse transcriptases evolved from an ancestor that has no proofreading ability, causing a low fidelity. In 2016, scientists successfully used directed evolution to modify the proofreading Thermococcus kodakarensis DNA-directed DNA polymerase into what they call a reverse transcribing xenotranscriptase (RTX). This new enzyme is able to copy from and proofread with RNA and DNA templates. It is expected to improve the accuracy in RNA sequencing and other forms of RT-PCR. It was commercialized some time before April 2018.

In 2022, selective mutagenesis converted a Kod DNA polymerase into one that produces α-l-threofuranosyl nucleic acid or threose nucleic acid (TNA). This result has been improved in 2024 and 2025 using HR-accelerated directed evolution, yielding several enzymes with near-natural speed and fidelity.

In 2025, scientists used directed evolution, accelerated by homologous recombination (HR), to change a DNA polymerase into an RNA polymerase. It is able to perform transcription quickly (3 nt/s) and accurately (>99%). It is also a somewhat "universal" polymerase, being also capable of RNA-directed DNA production (reverse transcription) and chimeric DNA–RNA amplification.

== See also ==
- Central dogma of molecular biology
- Exonuclease
- Ligase
- Nuclease
- PCR
- PARP
- Reverse transcription polymerase chain reaction
- RNA ligase (ATP)
