= RAD23A =

Protein-coding gene in the species Homo sapiens

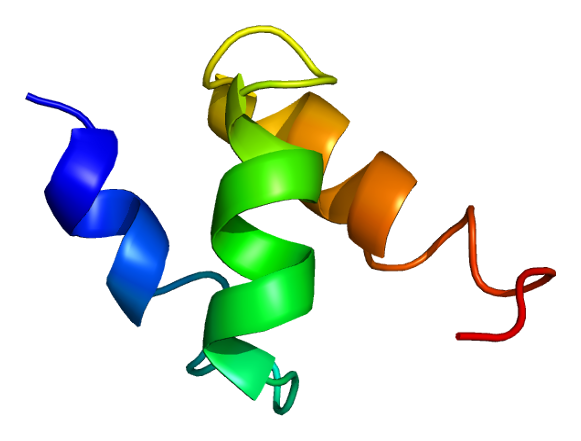

Identifiers
- Aliases: RAD23A, HHR23A, HR23A, RAD23 homolog A, nucleotide excision repair protein
- External IDs: OMIM: 600061; MGI: 105126; GeneCards: RAD23A
Available structures
PDB	Ortholog search: PDBe RCSB
PDB	List of PDB id codes 1DV0, 1F4I, 1IFY, 1OQY, 1P98, 1P9D, 1QZE, 1TP4, 2WYQ

Gene location (Human)
Chr.	Chromosome 19 (human)
Band	19p13.13	Start	12,945,855 bp
Band	19p13.13	End	12,953,642 bp

Gene location (Mouse)
Chr.	Chromosome 8 (mouse)
Band	8|8 C3	Start	85,560,648 bp
Band	8|8 C3	End	85,567,294 bp
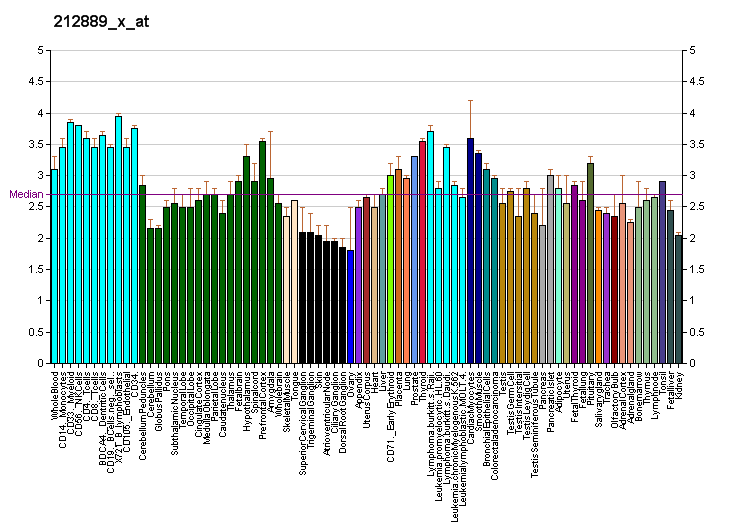

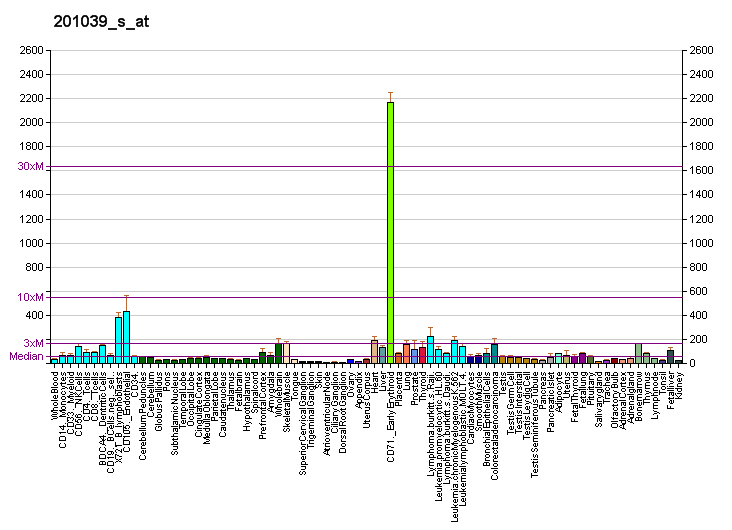

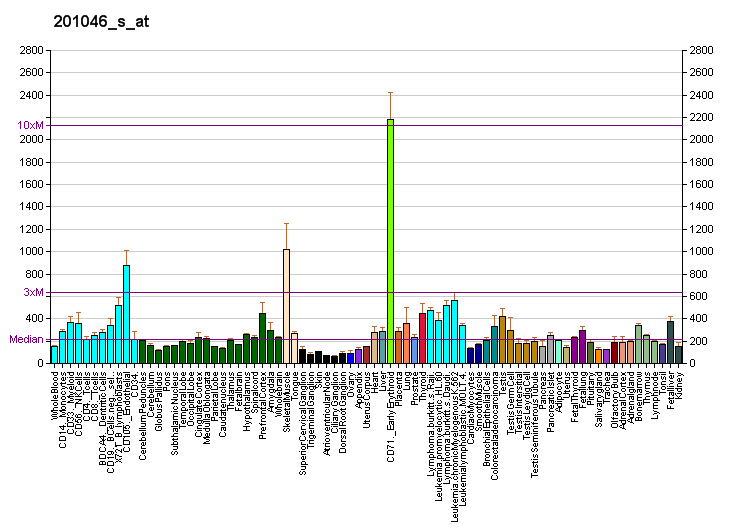
RNA expression pattern
Bgee	Human / Mouse (ortholog); Top expressed in: muscle of thigh; gastrocnemius muscle; Skeletal muscle tissue of rectus abdominis; glutes; triceps brachii muscle; Skeletal muscle tissue of biceps brachii; thoracic diaphragm; body of tongue; trabecular bone; olfactory bulb / Top expressed in: muscle of thigh; yolk sac; lacrimal gland; spermatocyte; lip; ankle; temporal muscle; triceps brachii muscle; human fetus; blood; More reference expression data
BioGPS	More reference expression data
Gene ontology
Molecular function	single-stranded DNA binding; ubiquitin-specific protease binding; damaged DNA binding; polyubiquitin modification-dependent protein binding; protein binding; kinase binding; ubiquitin binding; proteasome binding
Cellular component	proteasome complex; nucleoplasm; microtubule organizing center; cytosol; nucleus; cytoplasm; intracellular membrane-bounded organelle; protein-containing complex
Biological process	nucleotide-excision repair; positive regulation of viral genome replication; viral process; DNA repair; cellular response to DNA damage stimulus; proteasome-mediated ubiquitin-dependent protein catabolic process; regulation of proteasomal ubiquitin-dependent protein catabolic process; protein deubiquitination; protein destabilization; positive regulation of proteasomal ubiquitin-dependent protein catabolic process; positive regulation of cell cycle
Sources:Amigo / QuickGO
Orthologs
Databases	NCBI: entry; OMA: entry
Species	Human	Mouse
Entrez	5886	19358
Ensembl	ENSG00000179262	ENSMUSG00000003813
UniProt	P54725	P54726
RefSeq (mRNA)	NM_001270362; NM_001270363; NM_005053	NM_001297606; NM_001297607; NM_009010; NM_001378894; NM_001378895 NM_001378896
RefSeq (protein)	NP_001257291; NP_001257292; NP_005044	NP_001284535; NP_001284536; NP_033036; NP_001365823; NP_001365824 NP_001365825
Location (UCSC)	Chr 19: 12.95 – 12.95 Mb	Chr 8: 85.56 – 85.57 Mb
PubMed search
- Wikidata
View/Edit Human	View/Edit Mouse

UV excision repair protein RAD23 homolog A is a protein that in humans is encoded by the RAD23A gene.

== Function ==
The protein encoded by this gene is one of two human homologs of Saccharomyces cerevisiae Rad23, a protein involved in nucleotide excision repair (NER). This protein was shown to interact with, and elevate the nucleotide excision activity of 3-methyladenine-DNA glycosylase (MPG), which suggested a role in DNA damage recognition in base excision repair. This protein contains an N-terminal ubiquitin-like domain, which was reported to interact with 26S proteasome, as well as with ubiquitin protein ligase E6AP, and thus suggests that this protein may be involved in the ubiquitin mediated proteolytic pathway in cells.

RAD23A interacts with Y-family DNA polymerase iota (ι), DNA polymerase eta (η), DNA polymerase kappa and Y family DNA polymerase REV1. These polymerases have roles in the DNA damage tolerance pathway of translesion synthesis that allows the replication fork to continue without stalling even when damage is present.

== Interactions ==
RAD23A has been shown to interact with:

- Ataxin 3,
- PSMD4, and
- Sequestosome 1.
