= POLB =

POLB may refer to:

- DNA polymerase beta, human enzyme
- DNA polymerase II, bacterial enzyme
- Port of Long Beach
