= Klenow fragment =

Large protein fragment

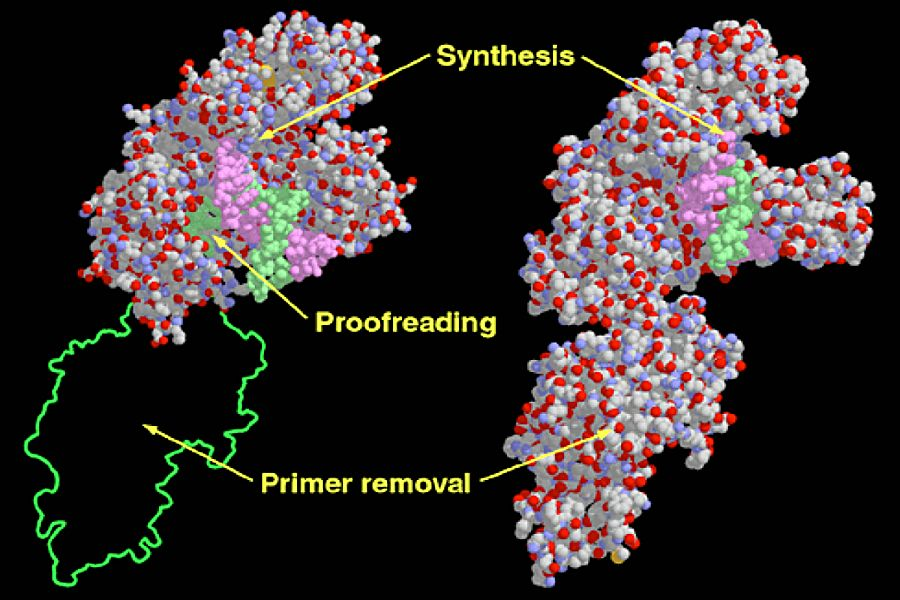
Functional domains in the Klenow Fragment (left) and DNA Polymerase I (PDB).

The Klenow fragment is a large protein fragment produced when DNA polymerase I (Pol I) from E. coli is enzymatically cleaved by the protease subtilisin. First reported in 1970, it retains the 5' → 3' polymerase activity and the 3’ → 5’ exonuclease activity for removal of precoding nucleotides and proofreading, but loses its 5' → 3' exonuclease activity.

The other smaller fragment formed when DNA polymerase I from E. coli is cleaved by subtilisin retains the 5' → 3' exonuclease activity but does not have the other two activities exhibited by the Klenow fragment (i.e. 5' → 3' polymerase activity, and 3' → 5' exonuclease activity).

== Research ==
Because the 5' → 3' exonuclease activity of DNA polymerase I from E. coli makes it unsuitable for many applications, the Klenow fragment, which lacks this activity, can be very useful in research. The Klenow fragment is extremely useful for research-based tasks such as:

- Synthesis of double-stranded DNA from single-stranded templates
- Filling in receded 3' ends of DNA fragments to make 5' overhang blunt
- Digesting away protruding 3' overhangs
- Preparation of radioactive DNA probes

The Klenow fragment was also the original enzyme used for greatly amplifying segments of DNA in the polymerase chain reaction (PCR) process, before being replaced by thermostable DNA polymerases such as Taq polymerase.

== The exo-Klenow fragment ==
Just as the 5' → 3' exonuclease activity of DNA polymerase I from E.coli can be undesirable, the 3' → 5' exonuclease activity of Klenow fragment can also be undesirable for certain applications. This problem can be overcome by introducing mutations in the gene that encodes Klenow. This results in forms of the enzyme being expressed that retain 5' → 3' polymerase activity, but lack any exonuclease activity (5' → 3' or 3' → 5'). This form of the enzyme is called the exo-Klenow fragment.

The exo-Klenow fragment is used in some fluorescent labeling reactions for microarray, and also in dA and dT tailing, an important step in the process of ligating DNA adapters to DNA fragments, frequently used in preparing DNA libraries for Next-Gen sequencing. (for instance see )

== From other polymerases ==
The term Klenow fragment is also applied more generally to any DNA polymerase I with the 5'-3'-exo activity removed. Ones that see practical use include:

- The Klenow fragment of Geobacillus stearothermophilus (Bst) Pol I. It has a strand displacement activity which allows for use in isothermal amplification without the necessity of denaturation of the DNA in a thermocycler. The exonuclease activity is deleted for higher yield.
- The Klenow fragment of Taq polymerase, more properly known as KlenTaq or Stoffel fragment.
