= (RNA-polymerase)-subunit kinase =

Class of enzymes

RNA polymerase subunit kinase

Identifiers
- EC no.: 2.7.11.23
- CAS no.: 122097-00-1

Databases
- IntEnz: IntEnz view
- BRENDA: BRENDA entry
- ExPASy: NiceZyme view
- KEGG: KEGG entry
- MetaCyc: metabolic pathway
- PRIAM: profile
- PDB structures: RCSB PDB PDBe PDBsum
- Gene Ontology: AmiGO / QuickGO
Search
- PMC: articles
- PubMed: articles
- NCBI: proteins

In enzymology, an [RNA-polymerase]-subunit kinase (EC 2.7.11.23) is an enzyme that catalyzes the chemical reaction

ATP + [DNA-directed RNA polymerase] $\rightleftharpoons$ ADP + phospho-[DNA-directed RNA polymerase]

Thus, the two substrates of this enzyme are ATP and DNA-directed RNA polymerase, whereas its two products are ADP and phospho-DNA-directed RNA polymerase.

This enzyme belongs to the family of transferases, specifically those transferring a phosphate group to the sidechain oxygen atom of serine or threonine residues in proteins (protein-serine/threonine kinases). The systematic name of this enzyme class is ATP:[DNA-directed RNA polymerase] phosphotransferase. Other names in common use include CTD kinase, and STK9.
