= Processivity =

In molecular biology and biochemistry, processivity is an enzyme's ability to catalyze "consecutive reactions without releasing its substrate".

For example, processivity is the average number of nucleotides added by a polymerase enzyme, such as DNA polymerase, per association event with the template strand. Because the binding of the polymerase to the template is the rate-limiting step in DNA synthesis, the overall rate of DNA replication during S phase of the cell cycle is dependent on the processivity of the DNA polymerases performing the replication. DNA clamp proteins are integral components of the DNA replication machinery and serve to increase the processivity of their associated polymerases. Some polymerases add over 50,000 nucleotides to a growing DNA strand before dissociating from the template strand, giving a replication rate of up to 1,000 nucleotides per second.

== DNA binding interactions ==
Polymerases interact with the phosphate backbone and the minor groove of the DNA, so their interactions do not depend on the specific nucleotide sequence. The binding is largely mediated by electrostatic interactions between the DNA and the "thumb" and "palm" domains of the metaphorically hand-shaped DNA polymerase molecule. When the polymerase advances along the DNA sequence after adding a nucleotide, the interactions with the minor groove dissociate but those with the phosphate backbone remain more stable, allowing rapid re-binding to the minor groove at the next nucleotide.

Interactions with the DNA are also facilitated by DNA clamp proteins, which are multimeric proteins that completely encircle the DNA, with which they associate at replication forks. Their central pore is sufficiently large to admit the DNA strands and some surrounding water molecules, which allows the clamp to slide along the DNA without dissociating from it and without loosening the protein–protein interactions that maintain the toroid shape. When associated with a DNA clamp, DNA polymerase is dramatically more processive; without the clamp most polymerases have a processivity of only about 100 nucleotides. The interactions between the polymerase and the clamp are more persistent than those between the polymerase and the DNA. Thus, when the polymerase dissociates from the DNA, it is still bound to the clamp and can rapidly reassociate with the DNA. An example of such a DNA clamp is PCNA (proliferating cell nuclear antigen) found in S. cervesiae.

== Polymerase processivities ==
Multiple DNA polymerases have specialized roles in the DNA replication process. In E. coli, which replicates its entire genome from a single replication fork, the polymerase DNA Pol III is the enzyme primarily responsible for DNA replication and forms a replication complex with extremely high processivity. The related DNA Pol I has exonuclease activity and serves to degrade the RNA primers used to initiate DNA synthesis. Pol I then synthesizes the short DNA fragments in place of the former RNA fragments. Thus Pol I is much less processive than Pol III because its primary function in DNA replication is to create many short DNA regions rather than a few very long regions.

In eukaryotes, which have a much higher diversity of DNA polymerases, the low-processivity initiating enzyme is called Pol α, and the high-processivity extension enzymes are Pol δ and Pol ε. Both prokaryotes and eukaryotes must "trade" bound polymerases to make the transition from initiation to elongation. This process is called polymerase switching.
