= DNA polymerase mu =

Protein-coding gene

POLM
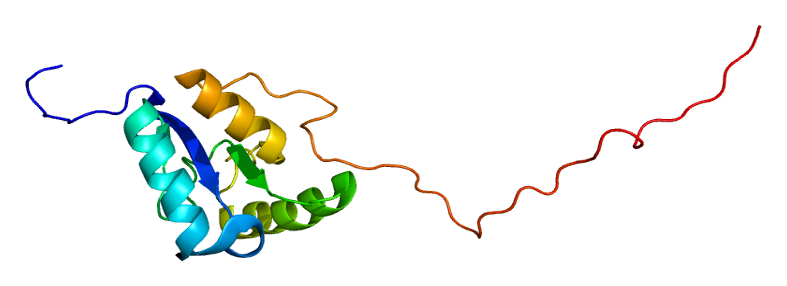

Identifiers
- Aliases: POLM, Pol Mu, Tdt-N, DNA polymerase mu, polymerase (DNA) mu
- External IDs: OMIM: 606344; MGI: 1860191; GeneCards: POLM
Available structures
PDB	Ortholog search: PDBe RCSB
PDB	List of PDB id codes 2HTF, 4LZD, 4M04, 4M0A, 4YCX, 4YD1, 4YD2, 2DUN
Enzyme activity
EC #	BRENDA	ExPASy	KEGG	MetaCyc
2.7.7.7	↗	↗	↗	↗

Gene location (Human)
Chr.	Chromosome 7 (human)
Band	7p13	Start	44,072,062 bp
Band	7p13	End	44,082,530 bp

Gene location (Mouse)
Chr.	Chromosome 11 (mouse)
Band	11|11 A1	Start	5,777,860 bp
Band	11|11 A1	End	5,788,016 bp
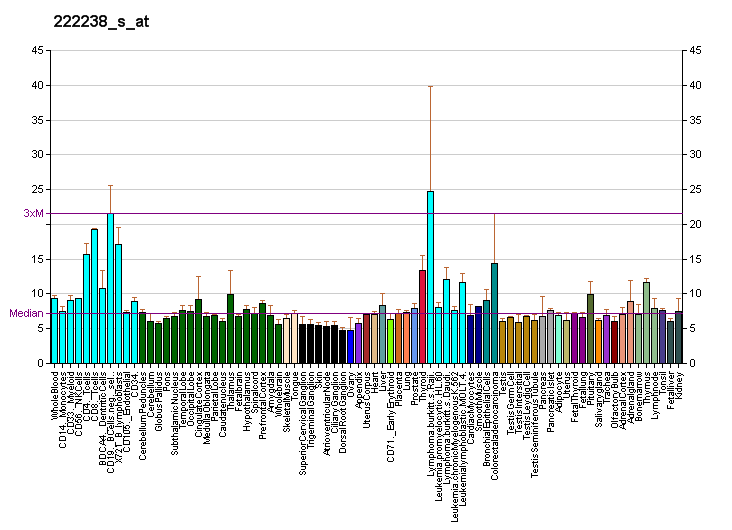
RNA expression pattern
Bgee	Human / Mouse (ortholog); Top expressed in: granulocyte; right lobe of thyroid gland; spleen; left lobe of thyroid gland; blood; right uterine tube; right lobe of liver; lymph node; fundus; gastric mucosa / Top expressed in: zygote; Ileal epithelium; secondary oocyte; granulocyte; perirhinal cortex; lactiferous gland; entorhinal cortex; primary oocyte; lip; choroid plexus of fourth ventricle; More reference expression data
BioGPS	More reference expression data
Gene ontology
Molecular function	transferase activity; DNA binding; DNA-directed DNA polymerase activity; nucleotidyltransferase activity; protein binding; metal ion binding; DNA polymerase; DNA polymerase activity
Cellular component	nucleus; nucleoplasm
Biological process	somatic hypermutation of immunoglobulin genes; B cell differentiation; DNA recombination; double-strand break repair via nonhomologous end joining; cellular response to DNA damage stimulus; DNA repair; DNA biosynthetic process
Sources:Amigo / QuickGO
Orthologs
Databases	NCBI: entry; OMA: entry
Species	Human	Mouse
Entrez	27434	54125
Ensembl	ENSG00000122678	ENSMUSG00000020474
UniProt	Q9NP87	Q9JIW4
RefSeq (mRNA)	NM_001284330; NM_001284331; NM_013284; NM_001362683	NM_017401
RefSeq (protein)	NP_001271259; NP_001271260; NP_037416; NP_001349612	NP_059097
Location (UCSC)	Chr 7: 44.07 – 44.08 Mb	Chr 11: 5.78 – 5.79 Mb
PubMed search
- Wikidata
View/Edit Human	View/Edit Mouse

DNA polymerase mu is a polymerase enzyme found in eukaryotes. In humans, this protein is encoded by the POLM gene.

== Function ==
Pol μ is a member of the X family of DNA polymerases. It participates in resynthesis of damaged or missing nucleotides during the non-homologous end joining (NHEJ) pathway of DNA repair. Pol μ interacts with Ku and DNA ligase IV, which also participate in NHEJ. It is structurally and functionally related to pol λ, and, like pol λ, pol μ has a BRCT domain that is thought to mediate interactions with other DNA repair proteins. Unlike pol λ, however, pol μ has the unique ability to add a base to a blunt end that is templated by the overhang on the opposite end of the double-strand break. Pol μ is also closely related to terminal deoxynucleotidyl transferase (TdT), a specialized DNA polymerase that adds random nucleotides to DNA ends during V(D)J recombination, the process by which B-cell and T-cell receptor diversity is generated in the vertebrate immune system. Like TdT, pol μ participates in V(D)J recombination, but only during light chain rearrangements. This is distinct from pol λ, which is involved in heavy chain rearrangements.

== POLM mutant mice ==
In polymerase mu mutant mice, hematopoietic cell development is defective in several peripheral and bone marrow cell populations with about a 40% decrease in bone marrow cell number that includes several hematopoietic lineages. Expansion potential of hematopoietic progenitor cells is also reduced. These characteristics correlate with reduced ability to repair double-strand breaks in hematopoietic tissue. Whole body gamma irradiation of polymerase mu mutant mice indicates that polymerase mu also has a role in double-strand break repair in other tissues unrelated to hematopoietic tissue. Thus polymerase mu has a significant role in maintaining genetic stability in hematopoietic and non-hematopoietic tissue.
