= DNA polymerase IV =

Class of enzymes

DNA pol IV

Identifiers
- Organism: Escherichia coli (str. K-12 substr. MG1655)
- Symbol: dinB
- Alt. symbols: dinP
- Entrez: 944922
- Orthologs: NCBI: entry; OMA: entry
- RefSeq (Prot): NP_414766.1
- UniProt: Q47155

Other data
- EC number: 2.7.7.7
- Chromosome: genome: 0.25 - 0.25 Mb
Search for
- Structures: Swiss-model
- Domains: InterPro

DNA polymerase IV is a prokaryotic polymerase that is involved in mutagenesis and is encoded by the dinB gene. It exhibits no 3′→5′ exonuclease (proofreading) activity and hence is error prone. In E. coli, DNA polymerase IV (Pol 4) is involved in non-targeted mutagenesis. Pol IV is a Family Y polymerase expressed by the dinB gene that is switched on via SOS induction caused by stalled polymerases at the replication fork. During SOS induction, Pol IV production is increased tenfold and one of the functions during this time is to interfere with Pol III holoenzyme processivity. This creates a checkpoint, stops replication, and allows time to repair DNA lesions via the appropriate repair pathway. Another function of Pol IV is to perform translesion synthesis at the stalled replication fork like, for example, bypassing N2-deoxyguanine adducts at a faster rate than transversing undamaged DNA. Cells lacking dinB gene have a higher rate of mutagenesis caused by DNA damaging agents.

== Replication bypass of 8-oxoguanine ==
Reactive oxygen species are produced continuously during normal metabolism and these damage DNA. DNA polymerase IV can catalyze translesion synthesis across a variety of DNA damages including 8-oxoguanine, a major oxidative damage with high mutagenic potential. Upon chromosome duplication by replicative polymerases, unrepaired 8-oxoguanine tends to mispair with A, so that during the next round of replication a G:C to T:A transversion mutation is produced (G:C → 8-oxoG:C → 8-oxoG:A → T:A). However, when DNA polymerase IV intervenes to bypass the damage, it preferentially incorporates the correct nucleotide CTP opposite 8-oxoguanine with high efficiency, thus avoiding potential mutations (G:C → 8-oxoG:C → 8-oxoG:C → GC).
