= DNA polymerase iota =

Protein-coding gene in the species Homo sapiens

POLI
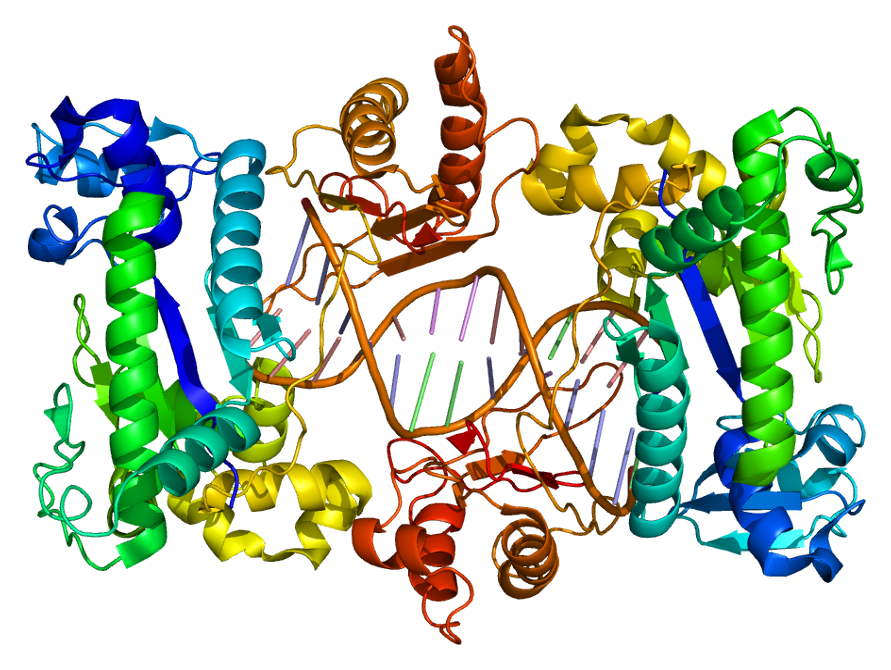

Identifiers
- Aliases: POLI, RAD30B, RAD3OB, polymerase (DNA) iota, DNA polymerase iota
- External IDs: OMIM: 605252; MGI: 1347081; GeneCards: POLI
Available structures
PDB	Ortholog search: PDBe RCSB
PDB	List of PDB id codes 1T3N, 1ZET, 2ALZ, 2DPI, 2DPJ, 2FLL, 2FLN, 2FLP, 2KHU, 2KHW, 2KTF, 2L0G, 2MBB, 3EPG, 3EPI, 3G6X, 3G6Y, 3GV5, 3GV7, 3GV8, 3H40, 3H4B, 3H4D, 3NGD, 3OSN, 3Q8P, 3Q8Q, 3Q8R, 3Q8S, 4EBC, 4EBD, 4EBE, 4EYH, 4EYI, 4FS1, 4FS2
Enzyme activity
EC #	BRENDA	ExPASy	KEGG	MetaCyc
2.7.7.7	↗	↗	↗	↗

Gene location (Mouse)
Chr.	Chromosome 18 (mouse)
Band	18 44.48 cM|18 E2	Start	70,641,751 bp
Band	18 44.48 cM|18 E2	End	70,663,691 bp
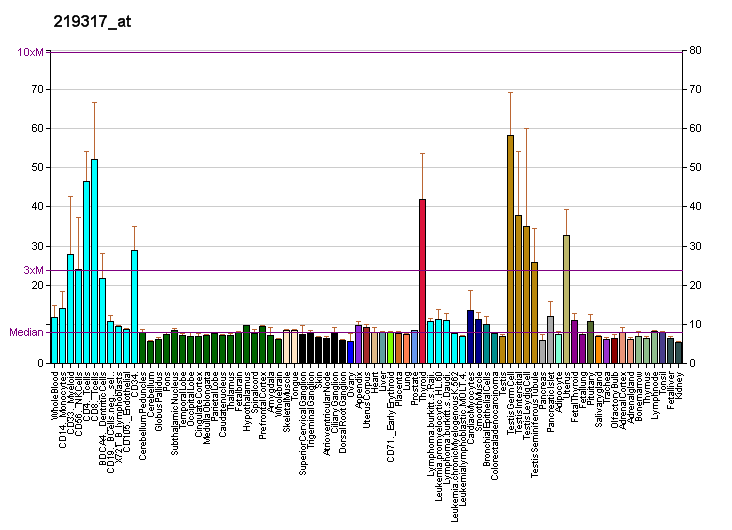
RNA expression pattern
Bgee	Human / Mouse (ortholog); n/a / Top expressed in: seminiferous tubule; spermatid; zygote; spermatocyte; blood; tail of embryo; pituitary gland; yolk sac; spleen; secondary oocyte
BioGPS	More reference expression data
Gene ontology
Molecular function	transferase activity; damaged DNA binding; DNA-directed DNA polymerase activity; DNA binding; nucleotidyltransferase activity; protein binding; metal ion binding
Cellular component	intracellular anatomical structure; nucleoplasm; nucleus; nuclear speck; cytoplasmic ribonucleoprotein granule
Biological process	DNA replication; translesion synthesis; DNA biosynthetic process; DNA repair; error-prone translesion synthesis; cellular response to DNA damage stimulus
Sources:Amigo / QuickGO
Orthologs
Databases	NCBI: entry; OMA: entry
Species	Human	Mouse
Entrez	11201	26447
Ensembl	ENSG00000101751	ENSMUSG00000038425
UniProt	Q9UNA4	Q6R3M4
RefSeq (mRNA)	NM_007195	NM_001136090; NM_001289515; NM_001289516; NM_011972
RefSeq (protein)	NP_009126; NP_001338539; NP_001338540; NP_001338541; NP_001338542 NP_001338543; NP_001338544; NP_001338545; NP_001338546; NP_001338547; NP_001338548; NP_001338549; NP_001338550; NP_001338561	NP_001129562; NP_001276444; NP_001276445; NP_036102; NP_001390096 NP_001390097; NP_001390098; NP_001390102; NP_001390103; NP_001390104; NP_001390106; NP_001390108; NP_001390112; NP_001390118
Location (UCSC)	n/a	Chr 18: 70.64 – 70.66 Mb
PubMed search
- Wikidata
View/Edit Human	View/Edit Mouse

DNA polymerase iota is an enzyme that in humans is encoded by the POLI gene. It is found in higher eukaryotes, and is believed to have arisen from a gene duplication from Pol η. Pol ι, is a Y family polymerase that is involved in translesion synthesis. It can bypass 6-4 pyrimidine adducts and abasic sites and has a high frequency of wrong base incorporation. Like many other Y family polymerases, Pol ι has low processivity, a large DNA binding pocket, and doesn't undergo conformational changes when DNA binds. These attributes are what allow Pol ι to carry out its task as a translesion polymerase. Pol ι only uses Hoogsteen base pairing, flipping the purines adenine and guanine to the syn conformations. During DNA synthesis, it will add thymine opposite to adenine and can add both cytosine and thymine opposite to guanine.

== Xeroderma pigmentosum variant ==
Xeroderma pigmentosum variant (XPV) cells lack DNA polymerase eta (η). Instead these cells use DNA polymerase iota (ι). Exposure of XPV cells to UV light causes a very high frequency and unique spectrum of UV-induced mutations that can ultimately lead to malignant transformation.
