= POLD2 =

Protein-coding gene in the species Homo sapiens

Identifiers
- Aliases: POLD2, DNA polymerase delta 2, accessory subunit
- External IDs: OMIM: 600815; MGI: 1097163; GeneCards: POLD2
Available structures
PDB	Ortholog search: PDBe RCSB
PDB	List of PDB id codes 3E0J

Gene location (Human)
Chr.	Chromosome 7 (human)
Band	7p13	Start	44,114,681 bp
Band	7p13	End	44,124,358 bp

Gene location (Mouse)
Chr.	Chromosome 11 (mouse)
Band	11|11 A1	Start	5,822,180 bp
Band	11|11 A1	End	5,828,292 bp
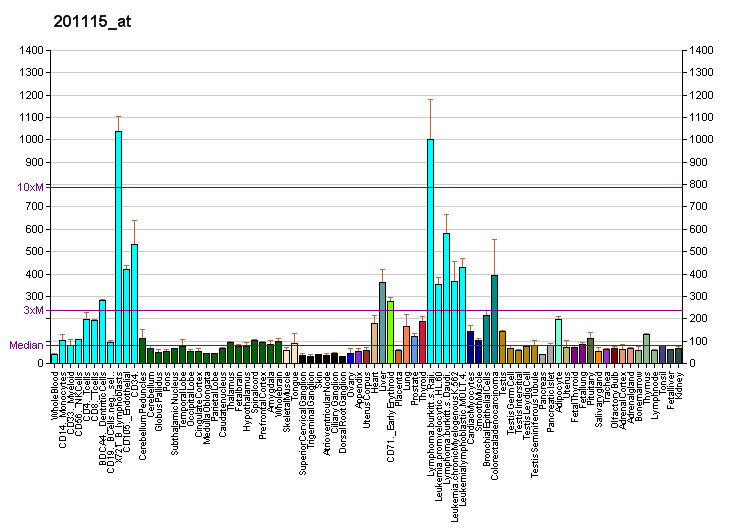
RNA expression pattern
Bgee	Human / Mouse (ortholog); Top expressed in: right uterine tube; apex of heart; ventricular zone; right lobe of liver; right auricle of heart; body of pancreas; left ovary; right hemisphere of cerebellum; skin of abdomen; muscle of thigh / Top expressed in: yolk sac; genital tubercle; ventricular zone; internal carotid artery; epiblast; embryo; mandibular prominence; maxillary prominence; external carotid artery; embryo; More reference expression data
BioGPS	More reference expression data
Gene ontology
Molecular function	DNA binding; protein binding; DNA-directed DNA polymerase activity
Cellular component	nucleoplasm; nucleus; delta DNA polymerase complex
Biological process	nucleotide-excision repair, DNA gap filling; DNA replication; translesion synthesis; transcription-coupled nucleotide-excision repair; nucleotide-excision repair, DNA incision; telomere maintenance; nucleotide-excision repair, DNA incision, 5'-to lesion; DNA repair; DNA strand elongation involved in DNA replication; cellular response to DNA damage stimulus; telomere maintenance via semi-conservative replication; DNA mismatch repair; DNA biosynthetic process
Sources:Amigo / QuickGO
Orthologs
Databases	NCBI: entry; OMA: entry
Species	Human	Mouse
Entrez	5425	18972
Ensembl	ENSG00000106628	ENSMUSG00000020471
UniProt	P49005	O35654
RefSeq (mRNA)	NM_001127218; NM_001256879; NM_006230	NM_008894; NM_001361942
RefSeq (protein)	NP_001120690; NP_001243808; NP_006221	NP_032920; NP_001348871
Location (UCSC)	Chr 7: 44.11 – 44.12 Mb	Chr 11: 5.82 – 5.83 Mb
PubMed search
- Wikidata
View/Edit Human	View/Edit Mouse

DNA polymerase delta subunit 2 is an enzyme that in humans is encoded by the POLD2 gene. It is a component of the DNA polymerase delta complex.

== Interactions ==
POLD2 has been shown to interact with PCNA.
