= Proofreading (biology) =

Correction of DNA replication errors

The term proofreading is used in genetics to refer to the error-correcting processes, first proposed by John Hopfield and Jacques Ninio, involved in DNA replication, immune system specificity, and enzyme-substrate recognition among many other processes that require enhanced specificity. The kinetic proofreading mechanisms of Hopfield and Ninio are non-equilibrium active processes that consume ATP to enhance specificity of various biochemical reactions.

In bacteria, all three DNA polymerases (I, II and III) have the ability to proofread, using 3' → 5' exonuclease activity. When an incorrect base pair is recognized, DNA polymerase reverses its direction by one base pair of DNA and excises the mismatched base. Following base excision, the polymerase can re-insert the correct base and replication can continue.

In eukaryotes, only the polymerases that deal with the elongation (delta and epsilon) have proofreading ability (3' → 5' exonuclease activity).Proofreading also occurs in mRNA translation for protein synthesis. In this case, one mechanism is the release of any incorrect aminoacyl-tRNA before peptide bond formation.

The extent of proofreading in DNA replication determines the mutation rate, and is different in different species. For example, loss of proofreading due to mutations in the DNA polymerase epsilon gene results in a hyper-mutated genotype with >100 mutations per million bases of DNA in human colorectal cancers.

The extent of proofreading in other molecular processes can depend on the effective population size of the species and the number of genes affected by the same proofreading mechanism.

== Bacteriophage T4 DNA polymerase ==
Bacteriophage (phage) T4 gene 43 encodes the phage's DNA polymerase replicative enzyme. Temperature-sensitive (ts) gene 43 mutants have been identified that have an antimutator phenotype, that is a lower rate of spontaneous mutation than wild type. Studies of one of these mutants, tsB120, showed that the DNA polymerase specified by this mutant copies DNA templates at a slower rate than the wild-type polymerase. However, the 3' to 5' exonuclease activity was no higher than wild-type. During DNA replication the ratio of nucleotides turned over to those stably incorporated into newly formed DNA is 10 to 100 times higher in the case of the tsB120 mutant than in wild-type. It was proposed that the antimutator effect may be explained by both greater accuracy in nucleotide selection and an increased efficiency of removal of noncomplementary nucleotides (proofreading) by the tsB120 polymerase.

When phage T4 virions with a wild-type gene 43 DNA polymerase are exposed to either ultraviolet light, which introduces cyclobutane pyrimidine dimer damages in DNA, or psoralen-plus-light, which introduces pyrimidine adducts, the rate of mutation increases. However, these mutagenic effects are inhibited when the phage's DNA synthesis is catalyzed by the tsCB120 antimutator polymerase, or another antimutator polymerase, tsCB87. These findings indicate that the level of induction of mutations by DNA damage can be strongly influenced by the gene 43 DNA polymerase proofreading function.

== SARS-CoV-2 proofreading enzyme ==
Severe acute respiratory syndrome coronavirus 2 (SARS-CoV-2) is the causative agent of the COVID-19 pandemic. The SARS-CoV-2 RNA virus genome encodes a replication-and transcription complex, a multisubunit protein machine that carries out viral genome replication and transcription, processes essential to the virus life cycle. One of the proteins specified by the coronavirus genome is a non-structural protein, nsp14, that is a 3'-to-5' exoribonuclease (ExoN). This protein resides in the protein complex nsp10-nsp14 that enhances replication fidelity by proofreading RNA synthesis, an activity critical for the virus life cycle. Furthermore, the coronavirus proofreading exoribonuclease nsp14-ExoN is required for maintaining genetic recombination generated during infection.
