= DNA polymerase lambda =

Protein-coding gene in the species Homo sapiens

POLL
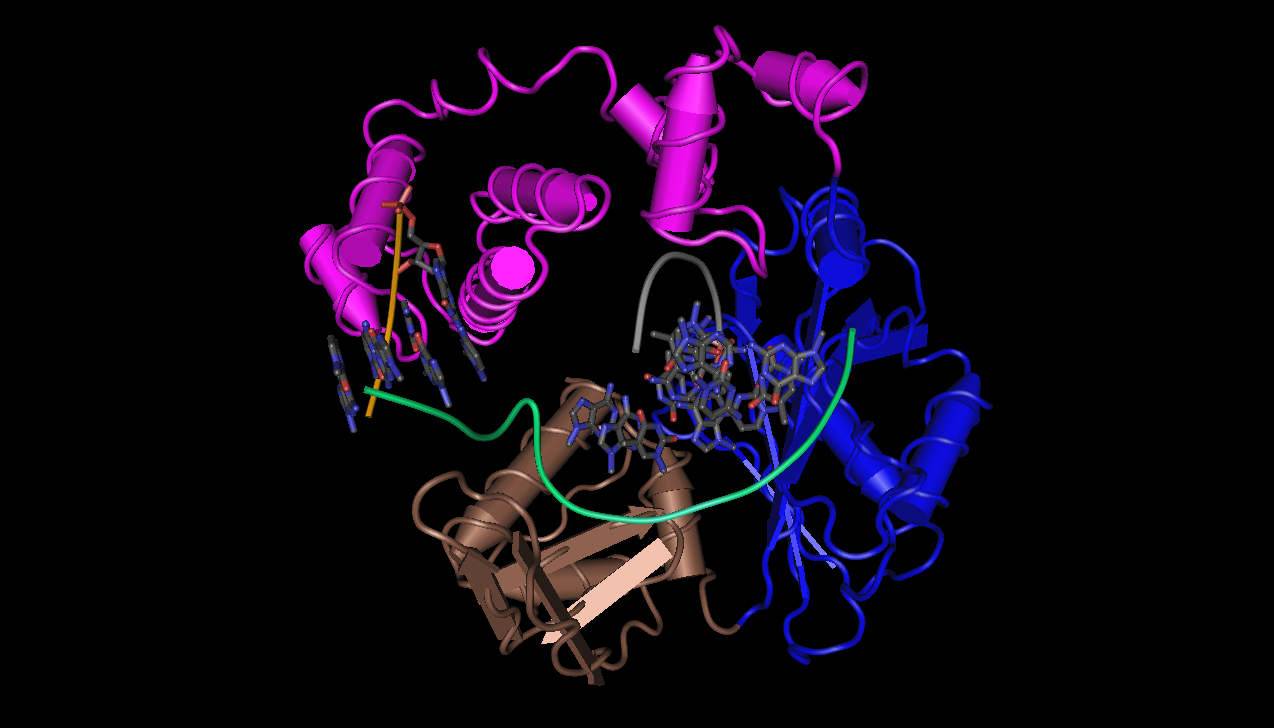

Identifiers
- Aliases: POLL, BETAN, POLKAPPA, polymerase (DNA) lambda, DNA polymerase lambda
- External IDs: OMIM: 606343; MGI: 1889000; GeneCards: POLL
Available structures
PDB	Ortholog search: PDBe RCSB
PDB	List of PDB id codes 1NZP, 1RZT, 1XSL, 1XSN, 1XSP, 2BCQ, 2BCR, 2BCS, 2BCU, 2BCV, 2GWS, 2JW5, 2PFN, 2PFO, 2PFP, 2PFQ, 3C5F, 3C5G, 3HW8, 3HWT, 3HX0, 3MDA, 3MDC, 3MGH, 3MGI, 3PML, 3PMN, 3PNC, 3UPQ, 3UQ0, 3UQ2, 4FO6, 4K4G, 4K4H, 4K4I, 4XA5, 4XUS, 4X5V, 5CR0, 4XQ8, 5CJ7, 5DKW, 5CP2, 5DDY, 5DDM, 5CB1, 5CWR, 4XRH, 5CHG, 5CA7
Enzyme activity
EC #	BRENDA	ExPASy	KEGG	MetaCyc
2.7.7.7	↗	↗	↗	↗

Gene location (Human)
Chr.	Chromosome 10 (human)
Band	10q24.32	Start	101,578,882 bp
Band	10q24.32	End	101,588,270 bp

Gene location (Mouse)
Chr.	Chromosome 19 (mouse)
Band	19|19 C3	Start	45,540,714 bp
Band	19|19 C3	End	45,548,970 bp
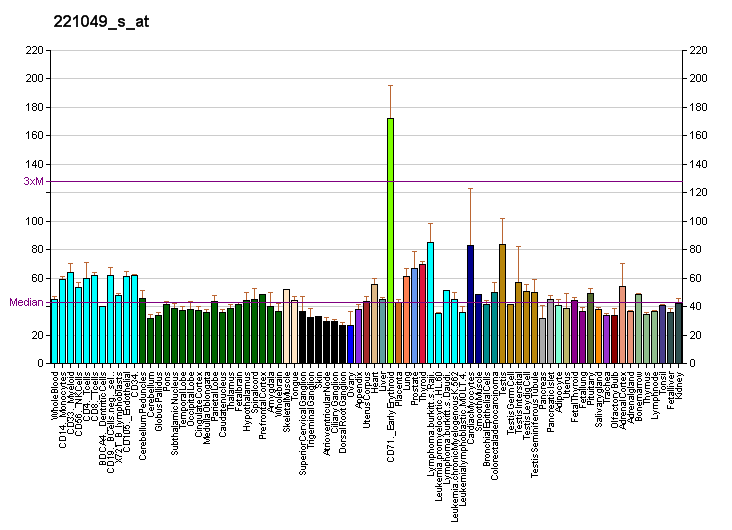
RNA expression pattern
Bgee	Human / Mouse (ortholog); Top expressed in: right uterine tube; body of pancreas; left testis; right testis; right lobe of thyroid gland; blood; body of stomach; granulocyte; apex of heart; anterior pituitary / Top expressed in: spermatocyte; spermatid; seminiferous tubule; muscle of thigh; secondary oocyte; primary oocyte; granulocyte; zygote; ventricular zone; medullary collecting duct; More reference expression data
BioGPS	More reference expression data
Gene ontology
Molecular function	transferase activity; DNA binding; nucleotidyltransferase activity; protein binding; metal ion binding; lyase activity; DNA-directed DNA polymerase activity; 5'-deoxyribose-5-phosphate lyase activity; DNA polymerase; DNA polymerase activity
Cellular component	nucleus; nucleoplasm
Biological process	DNA replication; nucleotide-excision repair; somatic hypermutation of immunoglobulin genes; cellular response to DNA damage stimulus; DNA repair; double-strand break repair via homologous recombination; base-excision repair, gap-filling; double-strand break repair via nonhomologous end joining; DNA biosynthetic process
Sources:Amigo / QuickGO
Orthologs
Databases	NCBI: entry; OMA: entry
Species	Human	Mouse
Entrez	27343	56626
Ensembl	ENSG00000166169	ENSMUSG00000025218
UniProt	Q9UGP5	Q9QUG2; Q9QXE2
RefSeq (mRNA)	NM_001174084; NM_001174085; NM_001308382; NM_013274	NM_020032; NM_001330506; NM_001330507
RefSeq (protein)	NP_001167555; NP_001167556; NP_001295311; NP_037406	NP_001334531; NP_001334532; NP_001334533; NP_001334535; NP_036178 NP_001317435; NP_001317436; NP_064416
Location (UCSC)	Chr 10: 101.58 – 101.59 Mb	Chr 19: 45.54 – 45.55 Mb
PubMed search
- Wikidata
View/Edit Human	View/Edit Mouse

DNA polymerase lambda, also known as Pol λ, is an enzyme found in all eukaryotes. In humans, it is encoded by the POLL gene.

== Function ==
Pol λ is a member of the X family of DNA polymerases. It is thought to resynthesize missing nucleotides during non-homologous end joining (NHEJ), a pathway of DNA double-strand break (DSB) repair. NHEJ is the main pathway in higher eukaryotes for repair of DNA DSBs. Chromosomal DSBs are the most severe type of DNA damage. During NHEJ, duplexes generated by the alignment of broken DNA ends usually contain small gaps that need to be filled in by a DNA polymerase. DNA polymerase lambda can perform this function.

The crystal structure of pol λ shows that, unlike the DNA polymerases that catalyze DNA replication, pol λ makes extensive contacts with the 5' phosphate of the downstream DNA strand. This allows the polymerase to stabilize the two ends of a double-strand break and explains how pol λ is uniquely suited for a role in non-homologous end joining.

In addition to NHEJ, pol λ can also participate in base excision repair (BER), where it provides backup activity in the absence of Pol β. BER is the major pathway for repair of small base damages resulting from alkylation, oxidation, depurination/depyrimidination, and deamination of DNA.

Besides its catalytic polymerase domain, pol λ has an 8 kDa domain and a BRCT domain. The 8 kDa domain has lyase activity that can remove a 5' deoxyribosephosphate group from the end of a strand break. The BRCT domain is a phosphopeptide binding domain that is common among DNA repair proteins and is likely involved in coordinating protein-protein interactions. Pol λ is structurally and functionally related to pol μ, another member of the X family that also participates in non-homologous end joining. Like pol μ, pol λ participates in V(D)J recombination, the process by which B-cell and T-cell receptor diversity is generated in the vertebrate immune system. Whereas pol μ is important for heavy-chain rearrangements, pol λ seems to be more important for light-chain rearrangements. The yeast Saccharomyces cerevisiae has a single homolog of both pol λ and pol μ called Pol4.

Translesion synthesis is a damage tolerance mechanism in which specialized DNA polymerases substitute for replicative polymerases in copying across DNA damages during replication. DNA polymerase lambda appears to be involved in translesion synthesis of abasic sites and 8-oxodG damages.

== Interactions ==
Pol λ has been shown to interact with PCNA. It has also been reported to interact with the XRCC4-DNA ligase IV complex via its N-terminal BRCT domain.
