= POLD3 =

Protein-coding gene in the species Homo sapiens

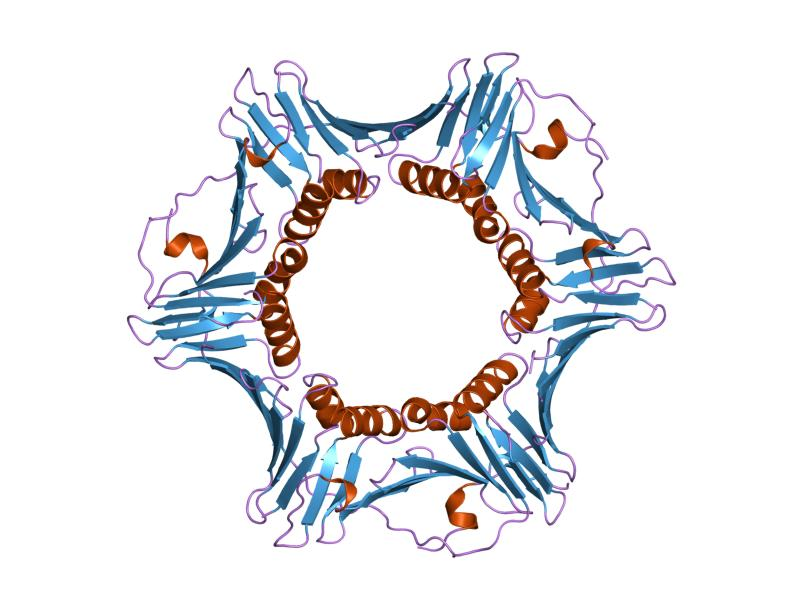

Identifiers
- Aliases: POLD3, P66, P68, PPP1R128, polymerase (DNA) delta 3, accessory subunit, DNA polymerase delta 3, accessory subunit
- External IDs: OMIM: 611415; MGI: 1915217; GeneCards: POLD3
Available structures
PDB	Ortholog search: PDBe RCSB
PDB	List of PDB id codes 1U76, 3E0J, 2N1G

Gene location (Human)
Chr.	Chromosome 11 (human)
Band	11q13.4	Start	74,493,851 bp
Band	11q13.4	End	74,669,117 bp

Gene location (Mouse)
Chr.	Chromosome 7 (mouse)
Band	7|7 E2	Start	99,731,318 bp
Band	7|7 E2	End	99,770,772 bp
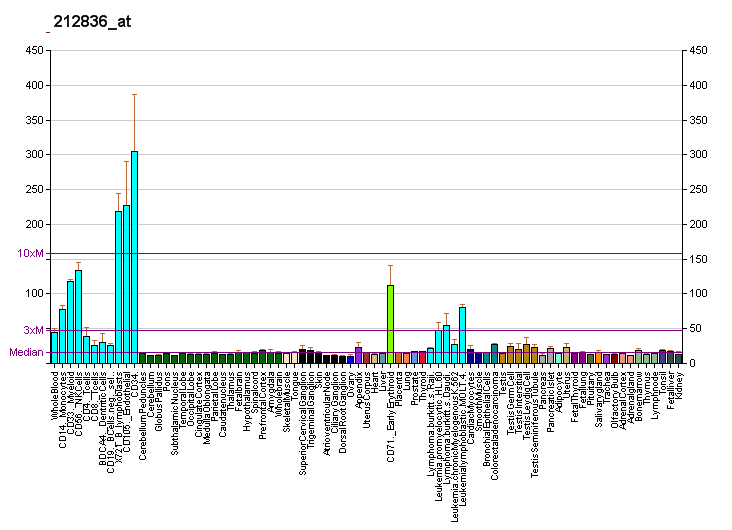
RNA expression pattern
Bgee	Human / Mouse (ortholog); Top expressed in: secondary oocyte; ventricular zone; testicle; sperm; ganglionic eminence; rectum; gonad; monocyte; kidney tubule; bronchial epithelial cell / Top expressed in: secondary oocyte; zygote; tail of embryo; primary oocyte; genital tubercle; spermatid; morula; somite; primitive streak; seminiferous tubule; More reference expression data
BioGPS	More reference expression data
Gene ontology
Molecular function	protein binding; DNA-directed DNA polymerase activity
Cellular component	delta DNA polymerase complex; nucleus; nucleoplasm; cytoplasm
Biological process	nucleotide-excision repair, DNA gap filling; DNA synthesis involved in DNA repair; DNA replication; translesion synthesis; transcription-coupled nucleotide-excision repair; nucleotide-excision repair, DNA incision; telomere maintenance; DNA-dependent DNA replication; nucleotide-excision repair, DNA incision, 5'-to lesion; DNA repair; cellular response to DNA damage stimulus; telomere maintenance via semi-conservative replication; DNA mismatch repair; DNA strand elongation involved in DNA replication; DNA synthesis involved in UV-damage excision repair
Sources:Amigo / QuickGO
Orthologs
Databases	NCBI: entry; OMA: entry
Species	Human	Mouse
Entrez	10714	67967
Ensembl	ENSG00000077514	ENSMUSG00000030726
UniProt	Q15054	Q9EQ28
RefSeq (mRNA)	NM_006591; NM_001363597	NM_133692; NM_001368380
RefSeq (protein)	NP_006582; NP_001350526	NP_598453; NP_001355309
Location (UCSC)	Chr 11: 74.49 – 74.67 Mb	Chr 7: 99.73 – 99.77 Mb
PubMed search
- Wikidata
View/Edit Human	View/Edit Mouse

DNA polymerase delta subunit 3 is an enzyme that in humans is encoded by the POLD3 gene. It is a component of the DNA polymerase delta complex.

== Interactions ==
POLD3 has been shown to interact with PCNA.
