= POLD4 =

Protein-coding gene in the species Homo sapiens

Identifiers
- Aliases: POLD4, POLDS, p12, polymerase (DNA) delta 4, accessory subunit, DNA polymerase delta 4, accessory subunit
- External IDs: OMIM: 611525; MGI: 1916995; GeneCards: POLD4

Gene location (Human)
Chr.	Chromosome 11 (human)
Band	11q13.2	Start	67,350,772 bp
Band	11q13.2	End	67,356,972 bp

Gene location (Mouse)
Chr.	Chromosome 19 (mouse)
Band	19|19 A	Start	4,281,953 bp
Band	19|19 A	End	4,283,688 bp
RNA expression pattern
Bgee	Human / Mouse (ortholog); Top expressed in: mucosa of transverse colon; right lobe of liver; granulocyte; duodenum; appendix; lymph node; Descending thoracic aorta; blood; left coronary artery; right coronary artery / Top expressed in: spleen; white adipose tissue; urinary bladder; granulocyte; adrenal gland; bone marrow; pancreas; islet of Langerhans; lip; muscle of thigh; More reference expression data
BioGPS	n/a
Gene ontology
Molecular function	protein binding; DNA-directed DNA polymerase activity
Cellular component	delta DNA polymerase complex; nucleoplasm; nucleolus; mitochondrion; cytosol; nucleus
Biological process	DNA-dependent DNA replication; nucleotide-excision repair, DNA gap filling; DNA synthesis involved in DNA repair; translesion synthesis; transcription-coupled nucleotide-excision repair; nucleotide-excision repair, DNA incision; telomere maintenance; nucleotide-excision repair, DNA incision, 5'-to lesion; DNA repair; cellular response to DNA damage stimulus; telomere maintenance via semi-conservative replication; DNA replication; DNA mismatch repair
Sources:Amigo / QuickGO
Orthologs
Databases	NCBI: entry; OMA: entry
Species	Human	Mouse
Entrez	57804	69745
Ensembl	ENSG00000175482	ENSMUSG00000024854
UniProt	Q9HCU8	Q9CWP8
RefSeq (mRNA)	NM_001256870; NM_021173	NM_027196
RefSeq (protein)	NP_001243799; NP_066996	NP_081472
Location (UCSC)	Chr 11: 67.35 – 67.36 Mb	Chr 19: 4.28 – 4.28 Mb
PubMed search
- Wikidata
View/Edit Human	View/Edit Mouse

DNA polymerase delta subunit 4, also known as DNA polymerase delta subunit p12, is a protein that in humans is encoded by the POLD4 gene. It is a component of the DNA polymerase delta complex.
