= DNA polymerase kappa =

Protein-coding gene in the species Homo sapiens

POLK
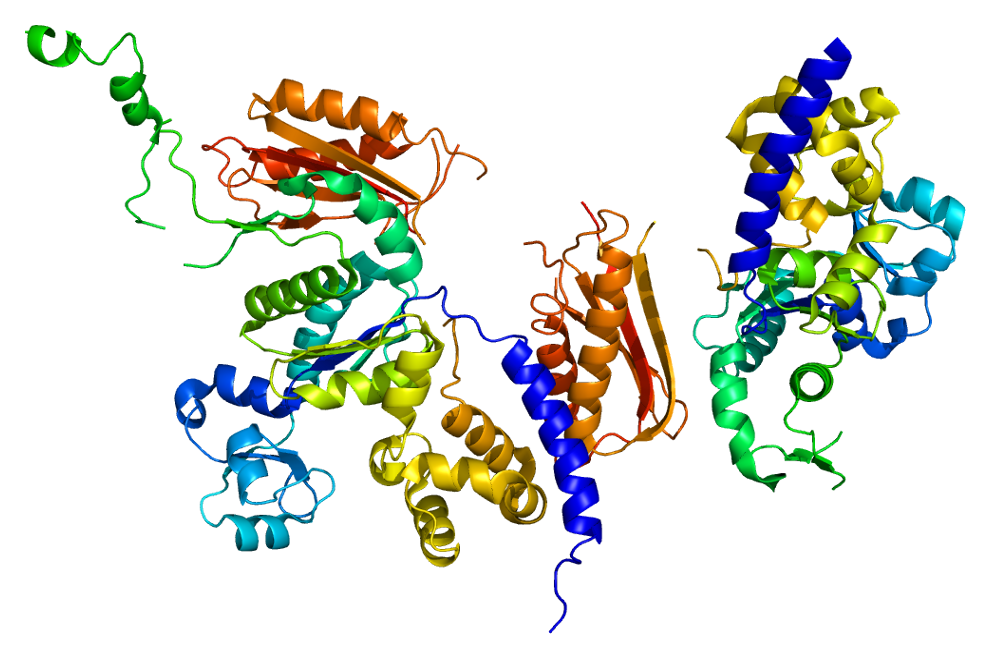

Identifiers
- Aliases: POLK, DINB1, DINP, POLQ, polymerase (DNA) kappa, DNA polymerase kappa
- External IDs: OMIM: 605650; MGI: 1349767; GeneCards: POLK
Available structures
PDB	Ortholog search: PDBe RCSB
PDB	List of PDB id codes 1T94, 2LSI, 2OH2, 2W7O, 2W7P, 3IN5, 3PZP, 4BA9, 4GK5, 4U6P, 4U7C
Enzyme activity
EC #	BRENDA	ExPASy	KEGG	MetaCyc
2.7.7.7	↗	↗	↗	↗

Gene location (Human)
Chr.	Chromosome 5 (human)
Band	5q13.3	Start	75,511,756 bp
Band	5q13.3	End	75,601,144 bp
RNA expression pattern
Bgee	Human / Mouse (ortholog); Top expressed in: Achilles tendon; corpus callosum; superficial temporal artery; epithelium of colon; mucosa of paranasal sinus; skin of hip; trabecular bone; monocyte; islet of Langerhans; synovial membrane / n/a; More reference expression data
BioGPS	n/a
Gene ontology
Molecular function	transferase activity; damaged DNA binding; DNA-directed DNA polymerase activity; DNA binding; nucleotidyltransferase activity; metal ion binding; protein binding
Cellular component	nucleoplasm; nucleus; nuclear body; site of DNA damage
Biological process	nucleotide-excision repair, DNA gap filling; DNA replication; translesion synthesis; transcription-coupled nucleotide-excision repair; nucleotide-excision repair, DNA incision; DNA biosynthetic process; nucleotide-excision repair, DNA incision, 5'-to lesion; DNA repair; cellular response to DNA damage stimulus; cellular response to UV; error-prone translesion synthesis; error-free translesion synthesis
Sources:Amigo / QuickGO
Orthologs
Databases	NCBI: entry; OMA: entry
Species	Human	Mouse
Entrez	51426	27015
Ensembl	ENSG00000122008	ENSMUSG00000021668
UniProt	Q9UBT6	Q9QUG2
RefSeq (mRNA)	NM_016218; NM_001345921; NM_001345922	NM_012048
RefSeq (protein)	NP_001332850; NP_001332851; NP_057302; NP_057302.1	NP_001334531; NP_001334532; NP_001334533; NP_001334535; NP_036178
Location (UCSC)	Chr 5: 75.51 – 75.6 Mb	n/a
PubMed search
- Wikidata
View/Edit Human	View/Edit Mouse

DNA polymerase kappa is a DNA polymerase that in humans is encoded by the POLK gene. It is involved in translesion synthesis.
