= DNA polymerase V =

Class of enzymes

DNA polymerase V, subunit C

Identifiers
- Organism: Escherichia coli (str. K-12 substr. MG1655)
- Symbol: umuC
- Entrez: 946359
- Orthologs: NCBI: entry; OMA: entry
- RefSeq (Prot): NP_415702.1
- UniProt: P04152

Other data
- EC number: 2.7.7.7
- Chromosome: genome: 1.23 - 1.23 Mb
Search for
- Structures: Swiss-model
- Domains: InterPro

DNA polymerase V, subunit D

Identifiers
- Organism: Escherichia coli (str. K-12 substr. MG1655)
- Symbol: umuD
- Entrez: 945746
- Orthologs: NCBI: entry; OMA: entry
- RefSeq (Prot): NP_415701.1
- UniProt: P0AG11

Other data
- EC number: 3.4.21.-
- Chromosome: genome: 1.23 - 1.23 Mb
Search for
- Structures: Swiss-model
- Domains: InterPro

DNA Polymerase V (Pol V) is a polymerase enzyme involved in DNA repair mechanisms in bacteria, such as Escherichia coli. It is composed of a UmuD' homodimer and a UmuC monomer, forming the UmuD'2C protein complex. It is part of the Y-family of DNA Polymerases, which are capable of performing DNA translesion synthesis (TLS). Translesion polymerases bypass DNA damage lesions during DNA replication - if a lesion is not repaired or bypassed the replication fork can stall and lead to cell death. However, Y polymerases have low sequence fidelity during replication (prone to add wrong nucleotides). When the UmuC and UmuD' proteins were initially discovered in E. coli, they were thought to be agents that inhibit faithful DNA replication and caused DNA synthesis to have high mutation rates after exposure to UV-light. The polymerase function of Pol V was not discovered until the late 1990s when UmuC was successfully extracted, consequent experiments unequivocally proved UmuD'2C is a polymerase. This finding lead to the detection of many Pol V orthologs and the discovery of the Y-family of polymerases.

== Function ==
Pol V functions as a TLS (translesion DNA synthesis) polymerase in E. coli as part of the SOS response to DNA damage. When DNA is damaged regular DNA synthesis polymerases are unable to add dNTPs onto the newly synthesized strand. DNA Polymerase III (Pol III) is the regular DNA polymerase in E. coli. As Pol III stalls unable to add nucleotides to the nascent DNA strand, the cell becomes at risk of having the replication fork collapse and cell death to occur. Pol V TLS function depends on association with other elements of the SOS response, most importantly Pol V translesion activity is tightly dependent on the formation of RecA nucleoprotein filaments. Pol V can use TLS on lesions that block replication or miscoding lesions, which modify bases and lead to wrong base pairing. However, it is unable to translate through 5' → 3' backbone nick errors. Pol V also lacks exonuclease activity, thus rendering unable to proofread synthesis causing it to be error prone.

=== SOS Response ===
SOS response in E. coli attempts to alleviate the effect of a damaging stress in the cell. The role of Pol V in SOS response triggered by UV-radiation is described as follows:

1. Pol III stalls at lesion site.
2. DNA replication helicase DnaB continues to expand the replication fork creating single stranded DNA (ssDNA) segments ahead of from the lesion.
3. ssDNA binding proteins (SSBs) stabilize ssDNA.
4. RecA recruited and loaded onto ssDNA by RecFOR replacing SSBs. Formation of RecA nucleoprotein filament (RecA*).
5. RecA functions through mediator proteins to activate Pol V (see Regulation).
6. Pol V accesses 3'-OH of nascent DNA strand and extends strand past the lesion site.
7. Pol III resumes elongation.

== Regulation ==
Pol V is only expressed in the cell during the SOS response. It is very tightly regulated at different levels of protein expression and under different mechanisms to avoid its activity unless absolutely necessary for survival of the cell. Pol V's strict regulation stems from its poor replication fidelity, Pol V is highly mutagenic and it is used as a last resort in DNA repair mechanisms. As such, the expression of the UmuD'2C complex takes 45–50 minutes after UV radiation exposure.

=== Transcriptional regulation ===
Transcription of the SOS response genes is negatively regulated by the LexA repressor. LexA binds to the promoter of the UmuDC operon and inhibits gene transcription. DNA damage in the cell leads to the formation of RecA*. RecA* interacts with LexA and stimulates its proteolytic activity, which leads to the autocleavage of the repressor freeing the operon for transcription. The UmuDC operon is transcribed and translated into UmuC and UmuD.

==== Post-translational regulation ====
The formation of the UmuD'2C complex is limited by the formation of UmuD' from UmuD. UmuD is made of a polypeptide with 139 amino acid residues that form a stable tertiary structure, however it needs to be post-translationally modified to be in its active form. UmuD has self-proteolytic activity that is activated by RecA, it removes 24 amino acids at the N-terminus, turning it into UmuD'. UmuD' can form a homodimer and associate with UmuC to form the active UmuD'2C complex.

==== Functional regulation ====
UmuD'2C complex is inactive unless associated with RecA*. Pol V directly interacts with RecA* at the 3' tip of the nucleoprotein filament; this is the site of the nascent DNA strand where Pol V restarts DNA synthesis. Additionally, it has been shown that the REV1/REV3L/REV7 pathway is necessary for the TLS synthesis mediated by DNA polymerase V.
