= DNA polymerase eta =

Protein-coding gene in the species Homo sapiens

POLH
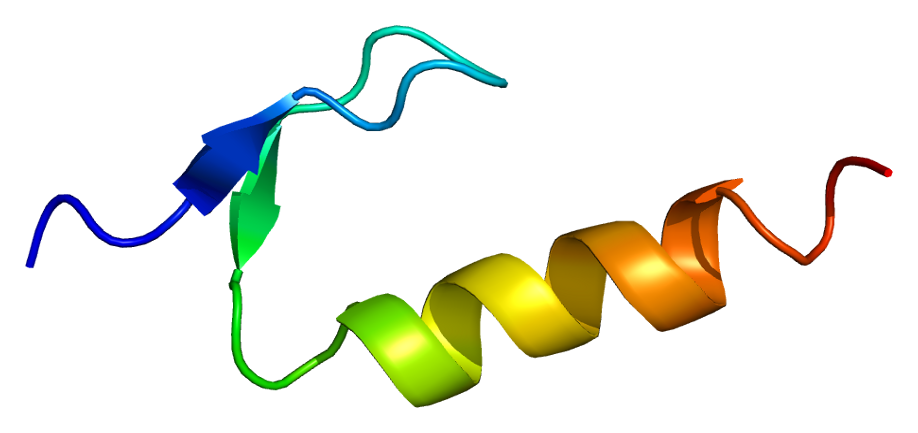

Identifiers
- Aliases: POLH, RAD30, RAD30A, XP-V, XPV, DNA polymerase eta, polymerase (DNA) eta
- External IDs: OMIM: 603968; MGI: 1891457; GeneCards: POLH
Available structures
PDB	Ortholog search: PDBe RCSB
PDB	List of PDB id codes 2I5O, 4RNM, 4J9O, 4YQW, 4YR0, 4ECX, 4ECS, 4ECT, 2LSK, 4DL5, 4ECR, 4DL3, 4J9K, 3MR5, 4J9N, 3SI8, 4YP3, 4O3N, 5EWE, 4ECU, 4DL6, 3MR6, 4RNN, 3MR3, 4ECY, 4O3P, 4RNO, 4ECQ, 4O3O, 4O3S, 4ECV, 4J9P, 4Q8F, 4ED3, 4ECZ, 4DL2, 4ECW, 3WUP, 5EWF, 4ED7, 4YR2, 4EEY, 4ED8, 4J9S, 3JAA, 4J9M, 4J9Q, 3MR2, 3TQ1, 4ED6, 4DL7, 4J9R, 4ED0, 4YR3, 4O3Q, 4ED1, 4J9L, 4DL4, 4O3R, 4RU9, 5EWG, 4ED2, 4Q8E, 5KG6, 5DGB, 5KFT, 5DG8, 5KFV, 5KFH, 5KG7, 5KG0, 5KFN, 5KFZ, 5KG1, 5KFX, 5KFC, 5KFU, 5KFA, 5KFK, 5KFI, 5KG4, 5KFQ, 5KFO, 5KFE, 5KFD, 5KFG, 5KG2, 5KFR, 5KFP, 5KG3, 5KFM, 5KFW, 5DGA, 5KFB, 5DG7, 5KFF, 5KFJ, 5DG9, 5L9X, 5KG5, 5KFS, 5KFL, 5KFY
Enzyme activity
EC #	BRENDA	ExPASy	KEGG	MetaCyc
2.7.7.7	↗	↗	↗	↗

Gene location (Human)
Chr.	Chromosome 6 (human)
Band	6p21.1	Start	43,576,185 bp
Band	6p21.1	End	43,620,523 bp

Gene location (Mouse)
Chr.	Chromosome 17 (mouse)
Band	17|17 C	Start	46,482,281 bp
Band	17|17 C	End	46,513,571 bp
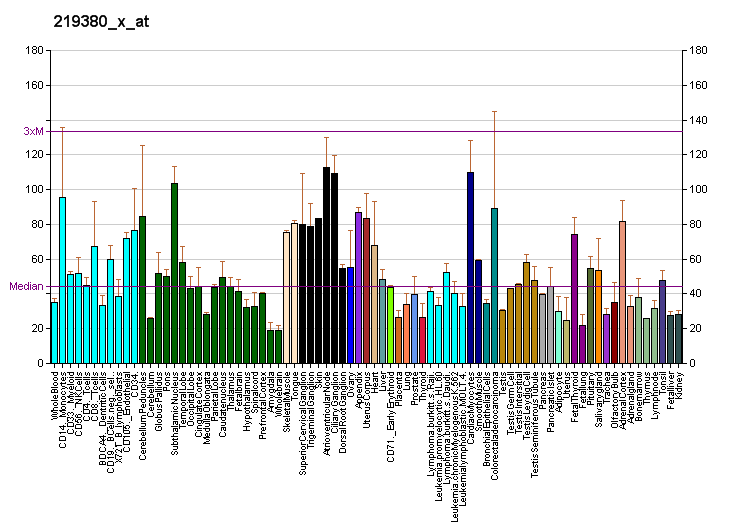
RNA expression pattern
Bgee	Human / Mouse (ortholog); Top expressed in: buccal mucosa cell; Skeletal muscle tissue of rectus abdominis; stromal cell of endometrium; trabecular bone; lower lobe of lung; epithelium of colon; nipple; tonsil; tail of epididymis; ventricular zone / Top expressed in: endothelial cell of lymphatic vessel; spermatocyte; Paneth cell; cumulus cell; body of femur; lumbar spinal ganglion; fossa; mesenteric lymph nodes; human fetus; seminal vesicula; More reference expression data
BioGPS	More reference expression data
Gene ontology
Molecular function	transferase activity; DNA binding; nucleotidyltransferase activity; metal ion binding; damaged DNA binding; protein binding; DNA-directed DNA polymerase activity
Cellular component	nucleoplasm; nucleus; cytosol; replication fork; site of double-strand break
Biological process	DNA synthesis involved in DNA repair; pyrimidine dimer repair; DNA biosynthetic process; postreplication repair; error-free translesion synthesis; regulation of DNA repair; cellular response to DNA damage stimulus; DNA replication; cellular response to UV-C; translesion synthesis; response to UV-C; DNA repair; response to radiation; error-prone translesion synthesis
Sources:Amigo / QuickGO
Orthologs
Databases	NCBI: entry; OMA: entry
Species	Human	Mouse
Entrez	5429	80905
Ensembl	ENSG00000170734	ENSMUSG00000023953
UniProt	Q9Y253	Q9JJN0
RefSeq (mRNA)	NM_001291969; NM_001291970; NM_006502	NM_030715; NM_001364947
RefSeq (protein)	NP_001278898; NP_001278899; NP_006493	NP_109640; NP_001351876
Location (UCSC)	Chr 6: 43.58 – 43.62 Mb	Chr 17: 46.48 – 46.51 Mb
PubMed search
- Wikidata
View/Edit Human	View/Edit Mouse

DNA polymerase eta (Pol η), is a protein that in humans is encoded by the POLH gene.

DNA polymerase eta is a eukaryotic DNA polymerase involved in the DNA repair by translesion synthesis. The gene encoding DNA polymerase eta is POLH, also known as XPV, because loss of this gene results in the disease xeroderma pigmentosum. Polymerase eta is particularly important for allowing accurate translesion synthesis of DNA damage resulting from ultraviolet radiation or UV.

== Function ==
This gene encodes a member of the Y family of specialized DNA polymerases. It copies undamaged DNA with a lower fidelity than other DNA-directed polymerases. However, it accurately replicates UV-damaged DNA; when thymine dimers are present, this polymerase inserts the complementary nucleotides in the newly synthesized DNA, thereby bypassing the lesion and suppressing the mutagenic effect of UV-induced DNA damage. This polymerase is thought to be involved in hypermutation during immunoglobulin class switch recombination.

=== Bypass of 8-oxoguanine ===
During DNA replication of the Saccharomyces cerevisiae chromosome, the oxidative DNA damage 8-oxoguanine triggers a switch to translesion synthesis by DNA polymerase eta. This polymerase replicates 8-oxoguanine with an accuracy (insertion of a cytosine opposite the 8-oxoguanine) of approximately 94%. Replication of 8-oxoguanine in the absence of DNA polymerase eta is less than 40%.

== Clinical significance ==
Mutations in this gene result in XPV, a variant type of xeroderma pigmentosum, characterized by sun sensitivity, elevated incidence of skin cancer, and at the cellular level, by delayed replication and hypermutability after UV-irradiation

== Interactions ==
POLH has been shown to interact with PCNA.
