= DNA polymerase delta =

Enzyme complex

DNA-directed DNA polymerase

Identifiers
- EC no.: 2.7.7.7
- CAS no.: 9012-90-2

Databases
- BRENDA: enzyme data
- ExPASy: NiceZyme view
- KEGG: enzyme entry
- MetaCyc: metabolic pathway
- Rhea: reactions
- PDB structures: RCSB PDB PDBe PDBsum
Search
- PMC: articles
- PubMed: articles
- NCBI: proteins

DNA polymerase delta (DNA Pol δ) is an enzyme complex found in eukaryotes that is involved in DNA replication and repair. The DNA polymerase delta complex consists of 4 subunits: POLD1, POLD2, POLD3, and POLD4. DNA Pol δ is an enzyme used for both leading and lagging strand synthesis. It exhibits increased processivity when interacting with the proliferating cell nuclear antigen (PCNA). As well, the multisubunit protein replication factor C, through its role as the clamp loader for PCNA (which involves catalysing the loading of PCNA on to DNA) is important for DNA Pol δ function.
