= FlmA–FlmB toxin–antitoxin system =

flmB
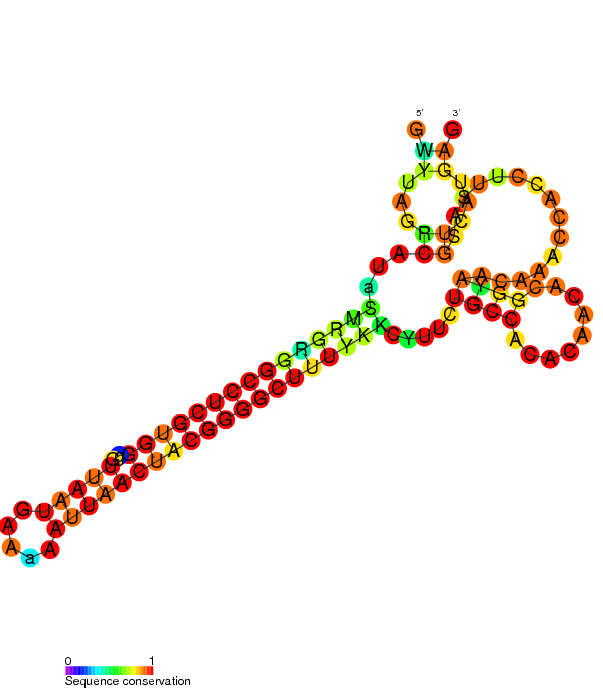
- Conserved secondary structure of flmB RNA.

Identifiers
- Symbol: FlmB

Other data
- RNA type: antisense RNA
- Domain(s): E. coli, S. enterica
- PDB structures: PDBe

The FlmA-FlmB toxin-antitoxin system consists of FlmB RNA (F leading-region maintenance B), a family of non-coding RNAs and the protein toxin FlmA. The FlmB RNA transcript is 100 nucleotides in length and is homologous to sok RNA from the hok/sok system and fulfills the identical function as a post-segregational killing (PSK) mechanism.

flmB is found on the F-plasmid of Escherichia coli and Salmonella enterica. It is responsible for stabilising the plasmid. If the plasmid is not inherited, long-lived FlmA mRNA and protein will be highly toxic to the cell, possibly to the point of causing cell death. Daughter cells which inherit the plasmid inherit the FlmB gene, coding for FlmB RNA which binds the leader sequence of FlmA mRNA and represses its translation.

== See also ==
- Toxin-antitoxin system
- IstR RNA
- RdlD RNA
- Sib RNA
- SymR RNA
- ptaRNA1
