= SymE–SymR toxin–antitoxin system =

SymR
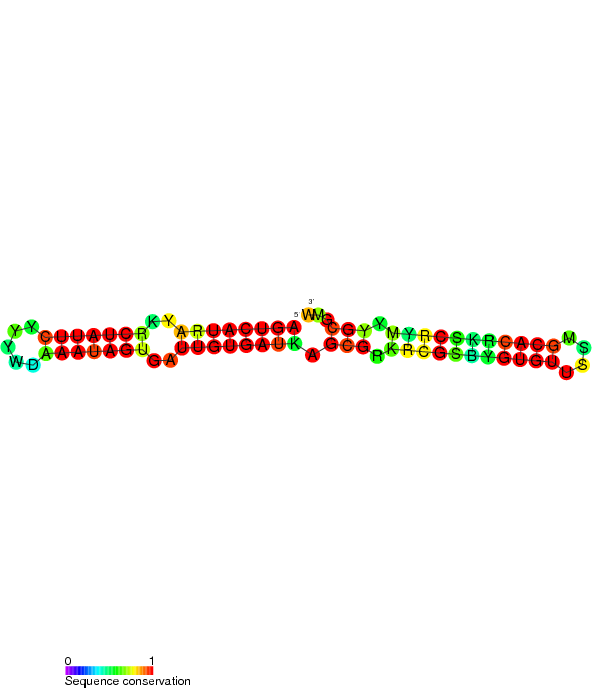
- Conserved secondary structure of SymR RNA.

Identifiers
- Symbol: SymR
- Rfam: RF01809

Other data
- RNA type: Antisense RNA
- Domain: E. coli
- PDB structures: PDBe

SymE Toxin of Type I toxin-antitoxin system
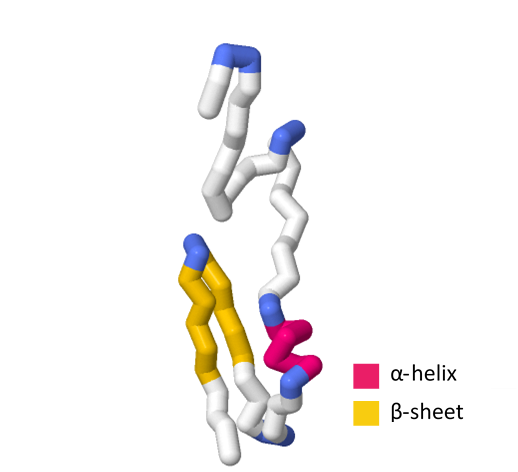
- SymE Toxin SymE Toxin of Type I toxin-antitoxin system

Identifiers
- Symbol: SymE_toxin
- Pfam: PF13957
- InterPro: IPR020883
- PROSITE: PS51740
Available protein structures:
- PDB: IPR020883 PF13957 (ECOD; PDBsum)
- AlphaFold: IPR020883; PF13957

The SymE-SymR toxin-antitoxin system consists of a small symbiotic endonuclease toxin, SymE, and a non-coding RNA symbiotic RNA antitoxin, SymR, which inhibits SymE translation. SymE-SymR is a type I toxin-antitoxin system, and is under regulation by the antitoxin, SymR. The SymE-SymR complex is believed to play an important role in recycling damaged RNA and DNA. The relationship and corresponding structures of SymE and SymR provide insight into the mechanism of toxicity and overall role in prokaryotic systems.

== Discovery ==
SymR was originally labelled RyjC and is a 77 nucleotide (nt) RNA with a σ^{70} promoter. RyjC was found to overlap the yjiW open reading frame on the opposite strand by 6 nt, and was characterized as an antisense RNA which bound the 5' untranslated region of yjiW. Further study led to the renaming of both yjiW and RyjC to SymE (SOS-induced yjiW gene with similarity to MazE) and SymR, respectively. Despite similarities to the AbrB superfamily, the SymE family has been exclusively found in proteobacteria.

== Relationship between SymE and SymR ==
The SymR antisense RNA is transcribed 3 nt behind the SymE start codon which is why the SymR promoter is considered embedded within the SymE codon. As a result, SymR blocks RNA translation of SymE by antisense binding, suggesting that this ultimately leads to SymR mRNA degradation. Amino acid analysis has concluded that SymE may have evolved into an RNA cleavage protein that exhibits toxin-like behavior due to transcription factors or antitoxins. In contrast to other common toxin-antitoxin systems, the SymR antitoxin is more stable than the SymE toxin.

Following DNA damage, the SOS response represses transcription of SymR RNA, allowing SymE toxin to degrade potentially damaged mRNA until DNA has been repaired. Conversely, SymE is tightly repressed by LexA repressor binding sites, SymR, and the Lon protease. These three factors are present at multiple levels where LexA is involved in transcription downregulation, SymR RNA is involved in translation downregulation, and Lon protease is involved in protein degradation. The extent of repression on SymE is dependent on the additive power of LexA, SymR, and Lon protease. Overall, SymE synthesis is slow since its activity is highly dependent on DNA repair proteins. In the cellular environment, mitomycin C damages DNA which leads to an overexpression of SymE mRNA to initiate DNA repair.

== Toxicity ==
The overexpression of SymE demonstrated negative effects on the growth of colony-forming cells when tested in vitro. SymE exhibits its toxicity by repressing global translation within the cell, cleaving mRNA in a similar manner to MazF, another toxin. Quantitative Northern blot experiments showed that SymR RNA is present in cells at 10 times the concentration of SymE mRNA (0.02 fmol μg^{−1} and 0.2 fmol μg^{−1}).

== Structure ==
=== SymE ===
The SymE toxin consists of 113 amino acids. When evaluating the amino acid sequence and tertiary structure of SymE, strong similarities were found which resemble the AbrB superfamily. This superfamily mainly functions as transcription factors or antitoxins; however, the similarity of SymE to the primary sequence and tertiary structure of the AbrB superfamily suggests that SymE proteins experienced an evolutionary shift from a transcription factor or antitoxin to a RNA-associating protein that exhibits toxin behavior. Between the AbrB superfamily protein structure and the SymE protein structure, there are several key hydrophobic residues that are highly conserved in the $\alpha$-helix at the center of the protein as well as the $\beta$ strand-1. Despite these key similarities, SymE exhibits polar residues not found in the general structure of the AbrB superfamily, indicating that these residues may have a role in the SymE RNA cleavage ability.

SWISS-MODEL contains more than several experimental structures and theoretical homology models that define certain aspects of the SymE primary sequence and tertiary structure. The UniProtKB accession number P39394 indicates the general structure of the SymE toxin in Escherichia coli (strain K12). In the SWISS-MODEL SymE theoretical model, the $\alpha$-helix contains amino acids G44, Q45, W46, L47, E48, A49, and A50. The $\beta$ strand-1 contains amino acids G55, T56, A57, V58, D59, V60, K61, V62, I67, V68, L69, T70, A71, Q72, P73, and P74 with the $\beta$-turn containing M63, E64, G65, and C66.

=== SymR ===
SymR is an antisense RNA meaning its secondary structure has characteristic stem-and-loop elements as well as unpaired regions flanking the structure. The predicted secondary structure of SymR showcases a loop containing the nucleotide sequence CCAG. This characteristic loop is shared with the lstR-1 and OhsC RNA proteins and is predicted to be a binding site for other proteins. Currently, there are no known files on the RCSB protein data bank or SWISS-MODEL repository that indicate a predicted tertiary structure of SymR.

== See also ==
- Toxin-antitoxin system
- Hok/sok system
