= Pard (disambiguation) =

A pard is an animal from medieval bestiaries.

Pard may also refer to:

- Pard Pearce (1896–1974), American football quarterback, first starting quarterback of the Chicago Bears
- parD, a plasmid anti-toxin - see ParDE type II toxin–antitoxin system
- Pard, gangster Roy Earle's dog in the 1941 film High Sierra

== See also ==
- Metator pardalinus, a grasshopper species also known as the pard grasshopper
- Parde, a synonym for Malbec
- Pardes (disambiguation)
