= TisB–IstR toxin–antitoxin system =

Biochemical process related to DNA damage

IstR
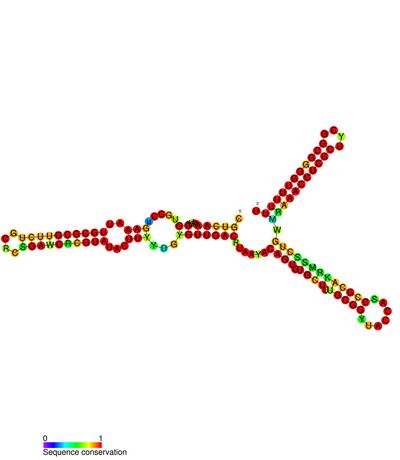
- Conserved secondary structure of IstR sRNA.

Identifiers
- Symbol: IstR
- Rfam: RF01400

Other data
- RNA type: sRNA
- Domain: Enterobacteriaceae
- PDB structures: PDBe

TisB Type I toxin-antitoxin system

Identifiers
- Symbol: TisB_toxin
- Pfam: PF13939
- Membranome: 394
Available protein structures:
- PDB: PF13939 (ECOD; PDBsum)
- AlphaFold: PF13939

The TisB-IstR toxin-antitoxin system is the first known toxin-antitoxin system which is induced by the SOS response in response to DNA damage.

== IstR-1 and IstR-2 ==
IstR sRNA (inhibitor of SOS-induced toxicity by RNA) is a family of non-coding RNA first identified in Escherichia coli. There are two small RNAs encoded by the IstR locus: IstR-1 and IstR-2, of which IstR-1 works as antitoxins against the toxic protein TisB (toxicity-induced by SOS B) which is encoded by the neighbouring tisAB gene. IstR-1 is a 75 nucleotide transcript expressed constitutively throughout growth, whereas IstR-2 is a 140 nucleotide transcript induced by Mitomycin C (MMC). Both IstR-2 and tisAB are thought to be regulated by LexA while IstR-1 is constitutively transcribed.

Deletion analysis confirmed the function of IstR, E. coli strain K-12 could not grow in the absence of IstR when tisAB was present. Inserting IstR genes on a plasmid allowed the bacteria to grow normally. Further studies showed that expression of IstR-1 alone is enough to remedy the toxic effects of TisB. IstR-2 is not involved in the regulation of tisAB.

== TisAB ==
The tisAB locus codes for two genes: tisA and tisB. The tisA reading frame was shown through a translation assay to not be translated. Its sequence is unconserved across species. TisB is a 29 amino acid peptide widely conserved in enterobacteria. TisB is responsible for conferring toxicity through suspected membrane disruption. Upon transcription of the tisB gene, a +1 inactive primary transcript mRNA is produced, which must be endonucleolytically processed 42 nucleotides from the 5' end to yield a +42 translationally competent mRNA. In the +42 form, the mRNA has a ribosome loading/standby site in an unstructured region >80 nt upstream of the tisB ribosome binding site, thus allowing translation of the TisB protein. This standby site is structurally unavailable in the inactive forms of the tisB mRNA (the +1 form and the +106 form produced by RNase III cleavage).

== Mechanism of TisB inhibition by IstR-1 ==
IstR-1 is thought to both inhibit translation of the TisB toxin, and promote RNase III cleavage of the RNA duplex formed when IstR-1 base pairs to tisB mRNA. Binding of the complementary sequence of istR-1 sRNA to tisB mRNA in the ribosome standby site is thought to prevent loading of ribosomes and therefore prevent translation of the TisB protein. A RACE analysis confirmed that IstR-1 binds TisB mRNA and the duplex is then degraded by RNase III. Degradation results in a +106 form, an inactive 249 nt transcript which cannot be translated.

== Proposed function of the IstR-TisB toxin-antitoxin system ==
The proposed function of this toxin-antitoxin system is to cause growth arrest, rather than cell death, in response to DNA damage, allowing time for repair processes to occur. TisB translation is under LexA control, so it is induced by DNA damage as part of the SOS response. Under normal conditions, very little tisB mRNA is synthesised and translation is inhibited, but when DNA damage occurs tisAB is strongly induced causing overexpression, which overrides inhibition by depleting the IstR-1 pool.

Experimental data has shown effects of TisB to be decreases in transcription, translation and replication, RNA degradation and ribosome disassembly. TisB does not affect transcription and translation directly in vitro, so these effects are thought to be downstream consequences of membrane damage.

TisB insertion into the membrane is thought to result in a loss of membrane potential. This could account for a decrease in ATP concentration in cells following triggering of the SOS response, causing slowing of cellular processes and inhibited cell growth. Also, it has been suggested that TisB may have a role in stabilising the bacterial persistence state after treatment of Escherichia coli with fluoroquinolones.

== See also ==
- Toxin-antitoxin system
- Sib RNA
- hok/sok system
