= LdrD–RdlD toxin–antitoxin system =

rdlD
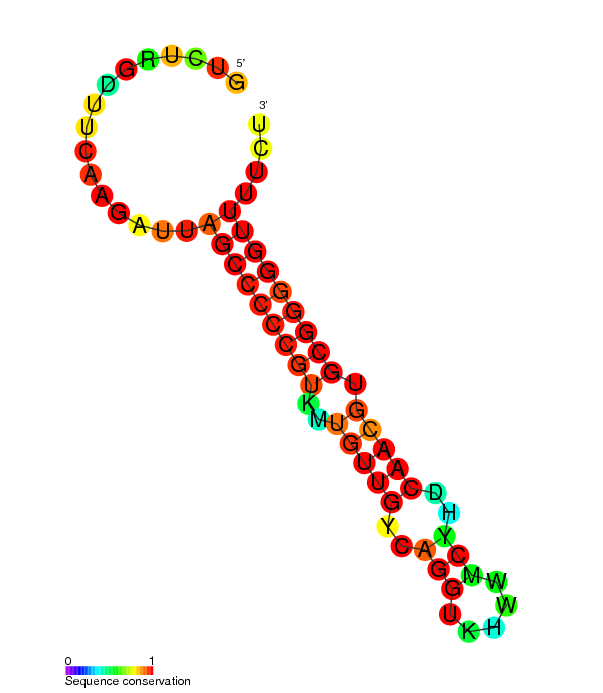
- Conserved secondary structure of rdlD RNA.

Identifiers
- Symbol: rdlD
- Rfam: RF01813

Other data
- RNA type: Gene; antisense;
- Domain: Enterobacteriaceae
- PDB structures: PDBe

LdrD Type I toxin-antitoxin system

Identifiers
- Symbol: Ldr_toxin
- Pfam: PF13940
- OPM superfamily: 469
- OPM protein: 5lbj
- Membranome: 636
Available protein structures:
- PDB: PF13940 (ECOD; PDBsum)
- AlphaFold: PF13940

RdlD RNA (regulator detected in LDR-D) is a family of small non-coding RNAs which repress the protein LdrD in a type I toxin-antitoxin system. It was discovered in Escherichia coli strain K-12 in a long direct repeat (LDR) named LDR-D. This locus encodes two products: a 35 amino acid peptide toxin (ldrD) and a 60 nucleotide RNA antitoxin. The 374nt toxin mRNA has a half-life of around 30 minutes while rdlD RNA has a half-life of only 2 minutes. This is in keeping with other type I toxin-antitoxin systems.

Northern blots showed that ldrD and rdlD are both transcribed and primer extension analysis showed the rdlD transcript is not translated.

Homologues exist in related Enterobacteriaceae such as Salmonella enterica and Shigella boydii. The Ldr peptide genes that have been discovered are thought to have evolved from a common ancestor.

== LDR sequences ==
Four long direct repeat (LDR) sequences were identified during genetic sequencing of a 718kb segment of the E. coli genome. One of these, LDR-D was studied further in order to determine the physiological function of these regions. The genes encoded by the other three LDRs, ldrA, ldrB and ldrC were confirmed to have the same activity as ldrD.

== Physiological effects of LdrD ==
The LdrD protein causes growth inhibition, loss of cell viability, nucleoid condensation and alteration in purine metabolism when overexpressed. Once growth arrest has been achieved, it is irreversible. Another potential effect of elevated LdrD could be reduced levels of cAMP in the cell. It inhibits both translation and transcription, which contributes significantly to reducing the cell's viability.

== Suspected mechanism of inhibition ==
The precise mechanism by which RdlD inhibits LdrD is unknown, however it has been shown that RdlD seems to regulate LdrD expression at the post-transcriptional level. The RdlD antisense RNA does not overlap with the translational initiation region of ldrD, as is common with Type 1 toxin-antitoxin systems.

== See also ==
- Toxin-antitoxin system
- Hok/sok system
- RatA
