= VapBC =

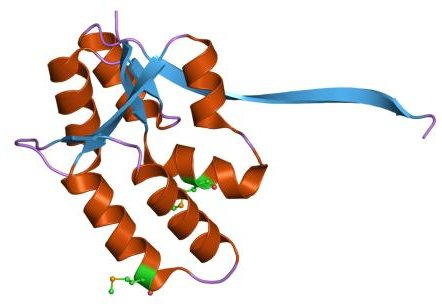
Crystallographic tertiary structure of a VapC toxin PIN domain.

VapBC (virulence associated proteins B and C) is the largest family of type II toxin-antitoxin system genetic loci in prokaryotes. VapBC operons consist of two genes: VapC encodes a toxic PilT N-terminus (PIN) domain, and VapB encodes a matching antitoxin. The toxins in this family are thought to perform RNA cleavage, which is inhibited by the co-expression of the antitoxin, in a manner analogous to a poison and antidote.

First discovered in 1992, vapBC loci are now thought make up around 37–42% of all type II toxin-antitoxin systems.

== Discovery ==
Following the discoveries of two other type II toxin-antitoxin systems, the first vapBC system to be characterised was found in Salmonella dublin strain G19 in 1992. It was characterised as a system for ensuring that all daughter cells contained a copy of the plasmid encoding the vapBC locus. The two components of this plasmidic system were originally named vagC and vagD (virulence-associated gene) for the toxin and antitoxin genes respectively. VagC was predicted to encode a 12kDa polypeptide, while vagD encoded a smaller 10kDa protein. Their open reading frames were found to overlap by a single nucleotide; suggesting they were translated together, and at a constant molar ratio.

== Distribution ==
VapBC operons have been found in distantly related prokaryotes, including the pathogens Leptospira interrogans, Mycobacterium tuberculosis and Piscirickettsia salmonis. The loci have been described as "surprisingly abundant, especially in Archaea"—vapBC family members made up 37% of all TA families identified by one bioinformatics search and 42% of those found by another.

Bioinformatics searches have discovered vapBC homologues on both chromosomes and plasmids, and often in high copy number per cell. They are less common, however, in Bacillota and "Cyanobacteria". Genomes with high numbers of vapBC loci include: M. tuberculosis with 45 predicted loci; S.tokodaii with 25; S.solfataricus with 23 and Sinorhizobium meliloti with 21.

== Function(s) ==
A proposed consensus secondary structure and primary sequence for the targets of the vapC toxin.

VapC toxins, specifically the PIN domains, act as ribonucleases in cleaving RNA molecules, thereby reducing the rate of translation. In the bacteria Shigella flexneri and Salmonella enterica, VapC toxins have been shown to perform specific cleavage of a tRNA, but in other bacteria the RNA cleavage may be less specific. The specificity of VapC-mediated RNase activity is thought to be influenced by both the primary sequence of the target and secondary structural motifs.

VapC is strongly inhibited by direct protein interaction with VapB, its cognate antitoxin. The toxin-antitoxin complex is thought to autoregulate its own operon, repressing transcription of both components through a DNA-binding domain in VapB.

In some organisms, vapBC loci have been assigned other potential functions. In the hyperthermophilic archaean Sulfolobus solfataricus, for example, a vapBC gene cassette is thought to regulate heat shock response.

== See also ==
- Toxin-antitoxin database
