= Zeta toxin =

Zeta toxin may refer to:

- Zeta toxin protein domain, a protein domain found in prokaryotes
- UDP-N-acetylglucosamine kinase, an enzyme
