= SrnB–SrnC toxin–antitoxin system =

The SrnB-SrnC toxin-antitoxin system of the F plasmid is homologous to the hok/sok system of R1. Like the hok/sok system, it performs a post-segregational killing function, ensuring that all surviving daughter cells inherit the F plasmid. The system consists of srnB' mRNA, which is relatively stable and codes for the toxic protein SrnB, srnB mRNA, a regulatory element and srnC mRNA, an antitoxin with complementarity to srnB.

== Mechanism of regulation and toxicity ==
The suspected method of regulation has not been directly tested for this system, however due to the strong similarity between this system and the hok/sok system, a mechanism of regulation has been inferred based on the structure of the mRNA and the mechanism used to regulate hok expression. The gene system consists of a stretch coding for srnB' , srnB and srnC mRNA. srnB completely overlaps srnB' and is partly overlapped by srnC. It appears that translation of srnB' is dependent on translation of srnB, so regulation of expression of the SrnB toxin can be achieved indirectly by regulating translation of srnB. It is thought that the initial mRNA transcript of srnB' is translationally inactive, and in plasmid-containing cells it will slowly bind srnC mRNA and be cleaved, or it will be specifically cleaved on the 3' end and rapidly bind srnC, which indirectly inhibits translation of srnB' by regulating translation of srnB and causing cleavage. In a plasmid free cell, srnC degrades rapidly and remaining srnB' mRNA is processed into translationally active 3'-truncated mRNA which yields the SrnB toxic protein, killing the cell. The mechanism by which SrnB causes toxicity is not known, however similarity between the SrnB toxin sequence and the hok toxin sequence suggests that they make have similar functions.
