= DinQ–agrB toxin–antitoxin system =

Bacterial toxin-antitoxin system

The dinQ-agrB type I toxin-antitoxin (TA) system was initially identified in Escherichia coli. This type I TA system is induced by the bacterial DNA damage response system known as the SOS response system.

== dinQ ==
dinQ, DNA-damage-inducible protein Q produces two major transcripts, only one, however, +44, is actively translated. Translation is initiated using the unusual GUG start codon and results in a 27 amino acid peptide. Plasmid-based expression of C-terminal triple FLAG-tagged dinQ located DinQ in the inner-membrane of E. coli. Overexpression of dinQ led to reduced survival, loss of transmembrane electrical polarity and reduced intracellular ATP concentrations.

== agrA and agrB ==
agrA and agrB are two small RNAs, 84 ribonucleotides long, named due to their position in the E. coli genome (arsR-gor region gene A and B). 31 ribonucleotides at the 5'-end of agrA and agrB show partial sequence complementarity within the primary transcript of dinQ, 25 for agrA and 30 for agrB being identical. Only deletion of the agrB gene led to an increase in sensitivity to DNA-damaging UV light, the agrB mutant also grew slower than the wild-type E. coli and failed to decompact its chromosomal DNA following a short non-lethal exposure to DNA-damaging UV.

== agrB inhibition of dinQ translation ==
agrB functions by binding to the translationally active dinQ transcript, +44, and, in so doing, stabilises the intramolecular sequestration of the Shine-Dalgarno translation initiation sequence. Additionally, agrB preferentially facilitates the endoribonucleolytic cleavage of the +44 dinQ transcript by RNase III as opposed to the primary +1 transcript.
