= Epsilon antitoxin =

Bacterial epsilon antitoxin
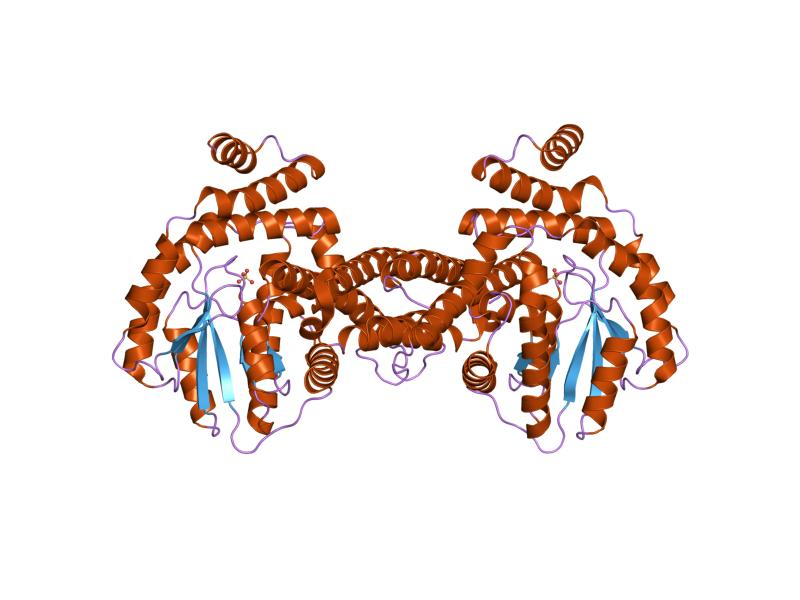
- crystal structure of the plasmid maintenance system epsilon/zeta: meachnism of toxin inactivation and toxin function

Identifiers
- Symbol: Epsilon_antitox
- Pfam: PF08998
- InterPro: IPR015090
Available protein structures:
- PDB: IPR015090 PF08998 (ECOD; PDBsum)
- AlphaFold: IPR015090; PF08998

In molecular biology, the epsilon antitoxin, produced by various prokaryotes, forms part of a post-segregational killing system, which is involved in the initiation of programmed cell death of plasmid-free cells. The protein is folded into a three-helix bundle that directly interacts with the zeta toxin, inactivating it.
