= Bange =

Bange may refer to:

== People ==
- Charles Ragon de Bange (1833–1914), French polytechnician and artillery colonel
- Ewan Bange (born 2001), British footballer
- Gert Bange (born 1977), German structural biologist and biochemist
- Jackie Bange, American television news anchor and reporter

== Places ==
- Aizu-Bange Station, a railway station on the Tadami Line in Aizubange, Fukushima Prefecture, Japan
- Baingoin County (Chinese: 班戈县; Pinyin transliteration: Bāngé Xiàn), in Tibet Autonomous Region, China
