= Sib RNA =

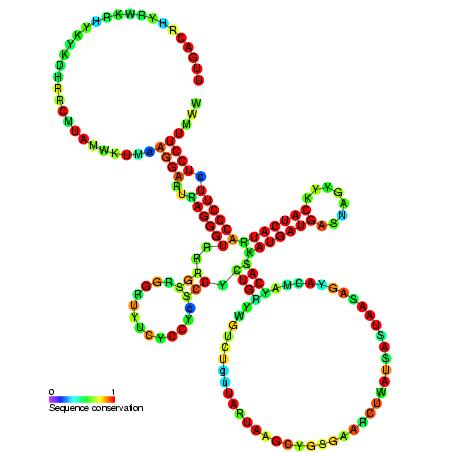
- Predicted secondary structure and sequence conservation of QUAD

Identifiers
- Symbol: QUAD
- Alt. Symbols: Sib RNA, QUAD RNA
- Rfam: RF00113

Other data
- RNA type: Gene; sRNA
- Domain: Bacteria
- SO: SO:0000655
- PDB structures: PDBe

Ibs Toxin of Type I toxin-antitoxin system

Identifiers
- Symbol: Ibs_toxin
- Pfam: PF13957
- Membranome: 391
Available protein structures:
- PDB: PF13957 (ECOD; PDBsum)
- AlphaFold: PF13957

Sib RNA refers to a group of related non-coding RNA. They were originally named QUAD RNA after they were discovered as four repeat elements in Escherichia coli intergenic regions. The family was later renamed Sib (for short intergenic abundant sequences) when it was discovered that the number of repeats is variable in other species and in other E. coli strains.

== Identification ==
These small RNA were identified computationally by searching the genome of E. coli for intergenic regions of high sequence identity (sequence conservation) with the genomes of closely related bacteria (several salmonella species and Klebsiella pneumoniae). This data was combined with microarray expression analysis and potential novel ncRNAs identified. The expression of novel ncRNA of interest was confirmed by northern blotting.

In this large scale screen these ncRNAs were simply referred to as candidates 43, 55 and 61. These 3 ncRNA appear to be highly homologous and are derived from a repeat region of the genome. Each of the ncRNA contains a short stretch homologous to boxC, a repeat element of unknown function present in 50 copies or more within the genome of E. coli.

== Function ==
Sib RNA regulates the expression of a toxic protein in a type I toxin-antitoxin system similar to that of hok/sok and ldr-rdl genes. The constitutively expressed Sib transcript regulates the ibs (induction brings stasis) open reading frame which encodes a small 18–19 amino acid hydrophobic protein which slows growth at moderate levels of expression and is toxic when overexpressed. The ibs gene is on the opposite strand to sib and is completely complementary, so the antisense-binding of Sib RNA with the ibs mRNA brings about dsRNA-mediated degradation.

When sib was deleted in multi-copy plasmids, the cells could not be maintained due to the toxicity of the unrepressed ibs protein. The toxicity mechanism of ibs protein is not fully understood, but a change in membrane potential upon over-expression of the protein suggests that interactions with membrane proteins or membrane insertion brings about cell death.

== See also ==
- Addiction module
- TisB-IstR toxin-antitoxin system
