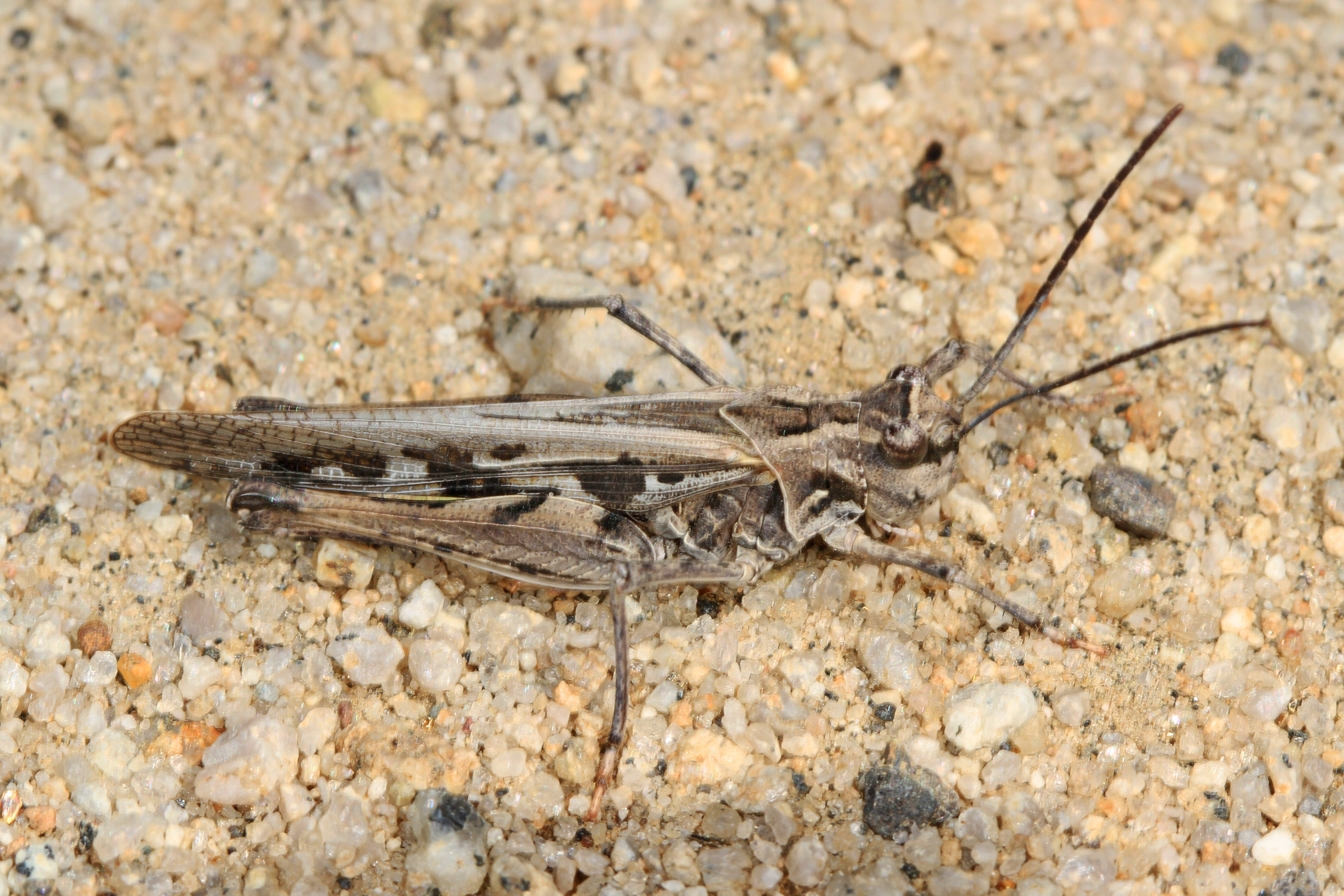

Scientific classification
- Domain: Eukaryota
- Kingdom: Animalia
- Phylum: Arthropoda
- Class: Insecta
- Order: Orthoptera
- Suborder: Caelifera
- Family: Acrididae
- Tribe: Psinidiini
- Genus: Metator
- Species: M. nevadensis

Binomial name
- Metator nevadensis (Bruner, 1905)

= Metator nevadensis =

Species of grasshopper

Metator nevadensis is a species of band-winged grasshopper in the family Acrididae. It is found in North America.
