= SOS box =

DNA sequence recognized by LexA

SOS box is the operator to which the LexA repressor binds to repress the transcription of SOS-induced proteins. SOS boxes are found near the promoter of various genes.

LexA binds to an SOS box in the absence of DNA damage. In the presence of DNA damage the binding of LexA is inactivated by the RecA activator. SOS boxes differ in DNA sequences and binding affinity towards LexA from organism to organism. Furthermore, SOS boxes may be present in a dual fashion, which indicates that more than one SOS box can be within the same promoter.

== Examples ==
Phylogenetic Clade	Sequence	Reference
Alphaproteobacteria	GAAC(N)_{7}GAAC; GTTC(N)_{7}GTTC	
Betaproteobacteria; Gammaproteobacteria	CTGT(N)_{8}ACAG	
Deltaproteobacteria	CTRHAMRYBYGTTCAGS	
Gram-positive bacteria	CGAACRNRYGTTYC	
Cyanobacteria	RGTAC(N)_{3}DGTWCB	

See Nucleic acid nomenclature for an explanation of non-GATC nucleotide letters.

== See also ==
- SOS response
