= Bacterial stress response =

The bacterial stress response enables bacteria to survive adverse and fluctuating conditions in their immediate surroundings. Various bacterial mechanisms recognize different environmental changes and mount an appropriate response. A bacterial cell can react simultaneously to a wide variety of stresses and the various stress response systems interact with each other by a complex of global regulatory networks.

Bacteria can survive under diverse environmental conditions and in order to overcome these adverse and changing conditions, bacteria must sense the changes and mount appropriate responses in gene expression and protein activity. The stress response in bacteria involves a complex network of elements that counteracts the external stimulus. Bacteria can react simultaneously to a variety of stresses and the various stress response systems interact (cross-talk) with each other. A complex network of global regulatory systems leads to a coordinated and effective response. These regulatory systems govern the expression of more effectors that maintain stability of the cellular equilibrium under the various conditions. These systems can include immediate responses such as chaperones, as well as slower responses like transcriptional regulation to control protein production, latency, and others.

Stress response systems can play an important role in the virulence of pathogenic organisms. Their stress response systems, such as entering into a latent state, can allow them to survive the stressful conditions inside of the host or other surroundings.

There are regulatory systems that respond to changes in temperature, pH, nutrients, salts, and oxidation. The response level is based on the amount of change that occurs in the environment. The response is highest when changes occur under stress conditions, in this case the control networks are called stress response systems. These systems are very similar within prokaryotes and some of the systems, specifically the heat shock response, are conserved in eukaryotes and archaea. While the systems are extremely similar, the conditions under which they are activated differ greatly from organism to organism. The systems that activate the response to environmental change have many control elements. These control elements can be specific to one gene or they can control a large group of genes. When control elements control a large group of genes it is called a regulon. A regulon is a group of genes that are all regulated by the same control pattern. A stimulon is all the genes who express responses to the same condition. The control elements also regulate the expression of genes during various environmental conditions including starvation, sporulation and others.

== Types of Stressors ==
A stressor that can induce a stress response in bacteria can be any condition outside of the ideal conditions for survival. The stressors that inflict harm to the cell are the ones that elicit the strongest responses. One such stressor is exposure to reactive oxygen species and reactive chlorine species from chemicals that are used as disinfectants. Included in this category is sodium hypochlorite (NaOCl), or household bleach. These chemicals inflict extensive cellular damage to different systems such as the bacterial membrane, denaturation of proteins, and interference with biomolecules such as amino acids, nucleic acids, and lipids. Another type of stressor could be the absence of a favorable electron acceptor for cellular respiration. The shift from a more favorable energy production to a less favorable one, such as nitrate, has been shown in a study to change cell morphology and composition of the cellular membrane. Other types of stressors include oxidants, nutrient deprivation, hypo/hyper-osmolarity, extreme pH, extreme temperature, and antimicrobial substances. This list of stressors is not comprehensive, as stressors by definition can be anything and everything that may not be favorable to a cell.

== Types of Responses ==
An initial stress response systems that will likely go into effect against situations that are damaging to the bacterial cell is chaperones. Chaperones are proteins that are responsible for keeping other proteins in their proper conformations by binding to them. Without the chaperones as a first line of defense, other stress response systems would not be able to react quickly enough to stop proteins from denaturing in time. While a protein is denaturing, it will produce intermediate conformations of itself, and these intermediates are what activate chaperone proteins. Another major stress response system is transcriptional regulation. Many transcriptional regulation systems are well defined, while others are less understood, but they can be activated by different pathways and stimuli, and is a general response to most stimuli. What this involves is proteins binding to promoter regions of DNA to regulate which sections are transcribed into RNA. The concentration of different RNA transcripts is then altered to favor the production of those that will produce proteins that will mitigate the effects of the stimulus. However, this system may be limited by the translational ability of the cell. The transcriptional changes can only be effective if ribosomal speed to translate mRNA to protein is quick enough. This can be a bottleneck in the capability of bacteria to react to stressors quick enough, and some stressors, such as oxidative stress, can inhibit the function of ribosomes.

A stress response that can occur under conditions that are non-advantageous, but also non-lethal, is the creation of a biofilm. In this response, bacterial cells can secrete extracellular polymeric substances to form a film that can provide support to the bacterial colony, such as by improving their ability to adhere to a surface. Another common stress response is latency. In a latent states, a cell will slow down its metabolism and become virtually dormant. This makes the cell much less affected by stressors such as antibacterial agents, starvation, hypoxia, and acidity. Some bacteria are able to enter a latent state and remain there for up to years before returning to an active state. A cell can also shift from production of unsaturated fatty acids to saturated fatty acids to decrease the fluidity of the cellular membrane. If the stressor is a molecule, this will make it more difficult for it to get into the cell. Overall cellular morphology can also be changed in response to a stressor.

In bacteria some other important stress response systems are:

- Heat shock response, controlled by the sigma factor sigma 32
- Envelope stress response, controlled mainly by the sigma factor sigma E and the Cpx two-component system
- Cold shock response, which governs expression of RNA chaperones and ribosomal factors
- (p)ppGpp-dependent stringent response, which reduces the cellular protein synthesis capacity and controls further global responses upon nutritional downshift

== Heat Shock Response ==
The heat-shock response in bacteria helps to stop any damage to the cellular processes in high temperature conditions. In response to high temperatures, heat-shock proteins, including chaperones and proteases are rapidly induced to protect against the denaturation of proteins within the bacteria. These chaperones help facilitate the folding of proteins within the cell to protect against rising temperatures. In most bacterial strains, sigma factor-32 (32) is responsible for regulating the heat-shock response. Sigma factor-32 is encoded by the rpoH gene and sits upstream of heat-shock genes.

== Envelope Stress Response ==
The two-component signal transduction (2CST) system allows the bacterial cell to sense stress within the system. A histidine kinase that can be found in the cell's inner membrane detects the stress. The histidine kinase detects stress due to the autophosphorylation that initially occurs upon detection. Once the stress is detected, the system moves to a cytoplasmic response regulator. This is due to the cell being in a phosphate group, but this new response regulator will start to act like a transcription factor. This means that it will start to change what is expressed when looking at the genes. This is especially true when looking at the Cpx proteins which help to prevent the protein from folding the wrong way or not at all. Cpx proteins also help to ensure that there will be no other damage when looking at other cellular processes.

In Escherichia coli, the Rcs phosphorelay system is one such envelope stress response pathway; it is negatively regulated by the inner membrane protein IgaA, which helps maintain membrane integrity under stress conditions.

== Cold Shock Response ==
When bacteria is in an area of very low and cold temperature, they will have a five hour long phase that will cause them not to grow at all. The way the bacteria tries to adapt is by creating cold shock proteins that will be transcription factors that will be upregulated during the five hour phase. Once this five hour period ends, the bacteria will start to grow again, but it will be at a very slow rate. These proteins will help for the bacteria to continue to grow and survive at the lower temperatures. A protein called CspA was originally found in E. coli and is known to be one of the first cold shock proteins discovered and is known to be a single-stranded RNA. This aids in the processes of transcription and translation, there can be condensation of the chromosome that occurs as well. This means that the cells will prematurely go onto the interphase stage of mitosis. There will also be an organization of the nucleoid which is when the intracellular and extracellular factors in the cell. And lastly, there is an enhancement when it comes to the survival of bacteria which helps the cell to get the food and nutrients it needs to survive

== SOS response ==
The SOS response is a bacterial adaptive response to DNA damage involving arrest of the cell cycle and the induction of processes that repair DNA damage. These responses have mainly been studied in the bacterium Escherichia coli. The marine cyanobacteria Prochlorococcus and Synechococcus also appear to have an E. coli-like SOS system for repair of DNA since they code for genes central to the E. coli SOS response such as lexA (regulation of the SOS system) and sulA (postponing of cell division until completion of DNA repair).

== Response to intestinal bile salts ==
Bile salts are prevalent in the mammalian intestine, a natural habitat of bacteria such as Escherichia coli. The bile salts deoxycholate, chenodeoxycholate, ursodeoxycholate and glycocholate were tested for their effect on E. coli gene expression, and were found to activate genes micF and osmY associated with membrane functions and response to oxidative stress, as well as the dinD gene (also known pcsA and orfY) that is induced by DNA damage as part of the SOS response. Thus it appears that enteric E. coli has evolved an adaptive strategy for dealing with stress caused by bile salts.

== See also ==
- Bacteria
- Heat Shock Response
- Cold Shock Response
