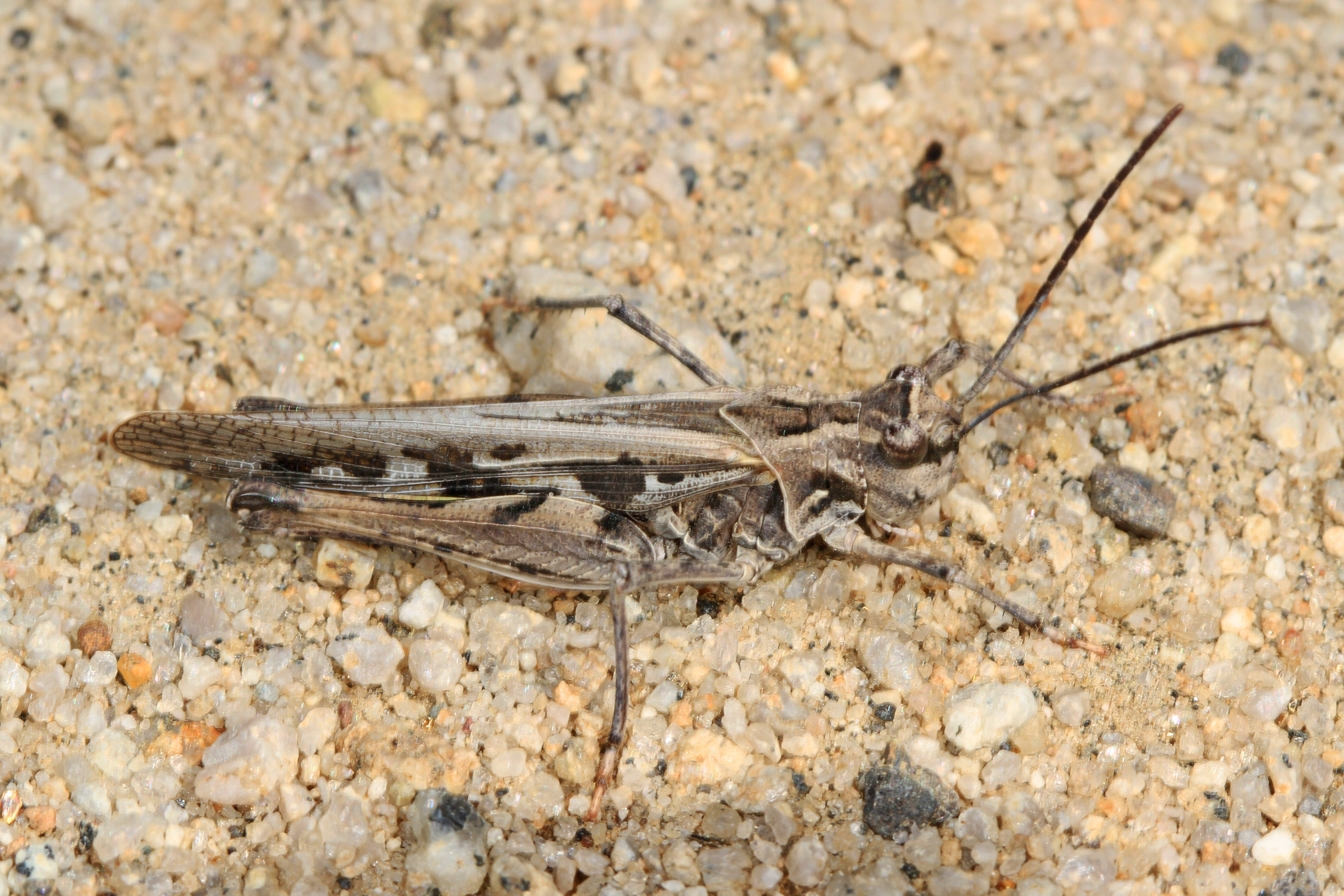
- Metator nevadensis

Scientific classification
- Domain: Eukaryota
- Kingdom: Animalia
- Phylum: Arthropoda
- Class: Insecta
- Order: Orthoptera
- Suborder: Caelifera
- Family: Acrididae
- Subfamily: Oedipodinae
- Tribe: Psinidiini
- Genus: Metator; McNeill, 1901

= Metator =

Genus of grasshoppers

Metator is a genus of band-winged grasshoppers in the family Acrididae. There are at least two described species in Metator.

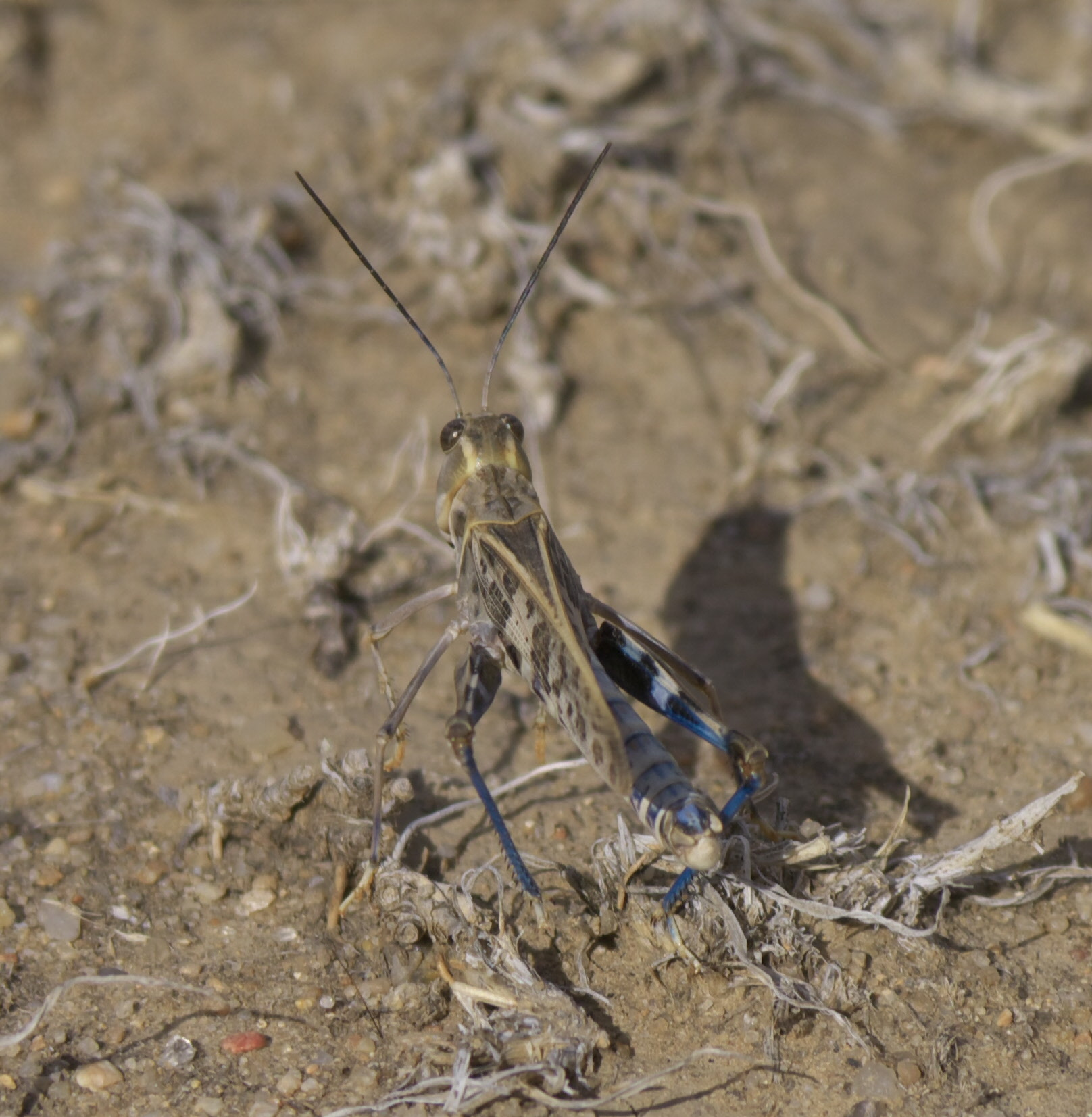
Metator pardalinus

== Species ==
These two species belong to the genus Metator:

- Metator nevadensis (Bruner, 1905)
- Metator pardalinus (Saussure, 1884) (blue-legged grasshopper)
