= ParDE type II toxin–antitoxin system =

ParE toxin of type II Toxin-anittoxin system
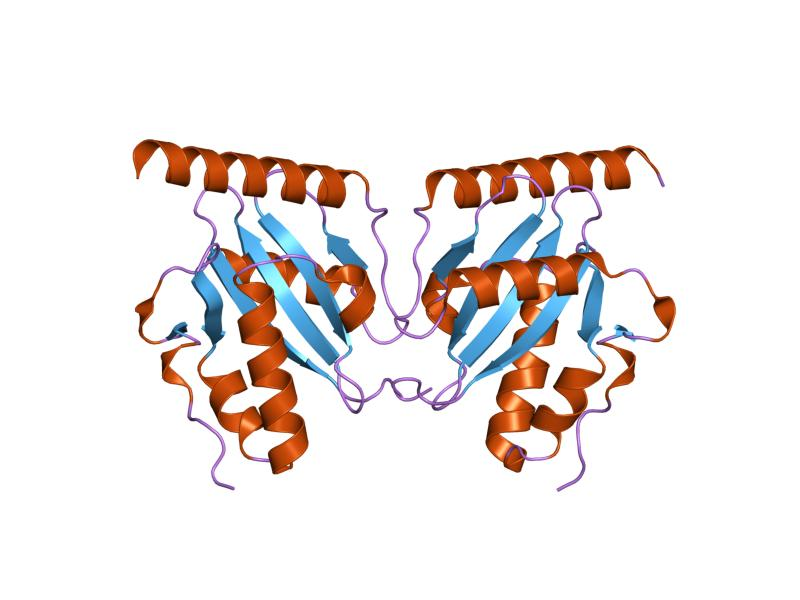
- crystal structure of archaeal rele-relb complex from pyrococcus horikoshii ot3

Identifiers
- Symbol: ParE_toxin
- Pfam: PF05016
- Pfam clan: CL0136
- InterPro: IPR007712
Available protein structures:
- PDB: IPR007712 PF05016 (ECOD; PDBsum)
- AlphaFold: IPR007712; PF05016

ParD

Identifiers
- Symbol: ParD
- Pfam: PF09386
- Pfam clan: CL0057
- InterPro: IPR018985
Available protein structures:
- PDB: IPR018985 PF09386 (ECOD; PDBsum)
- AlphaFold: IPR018985; PF09386

The parDE type II toxin-antitoxin system is one example of the bacterial toxin-antitoxin (TA) systems that encode two proteins, one a potent inhibitor of cell proliferation (toxin) and the other its specific antidote (antitoxin). These systems preferentially guarantee growth of plasmid-carrying daughter cells in a bacterial population by killing newborn bacteria that have not inherited a plasmid copy at cell division (post-segregational killing).

ParD is a plasmid anti-toxin that forms a ribbon-helix-helix DNA binding structure. It stabilises plasmids by inhibiting ParE toxicity in cells that express ParD and ParE. ParD forms a dimer and also regulates its own promoter (parDE). As with CcdB the toxin target is DNA gyrase. Induction of ParE toxin results in inhibition of cell division but not cell growth.

The parD and ccD systems are found to be strikingly similar in terms of their structures and actions. The antitoxin protein of each system interacts with its cognate toxin to neutralise the activity of the toxin and in the process the complex of the two becomes an efficient transcription repressor.
