= Par stability determinant =

FstAT
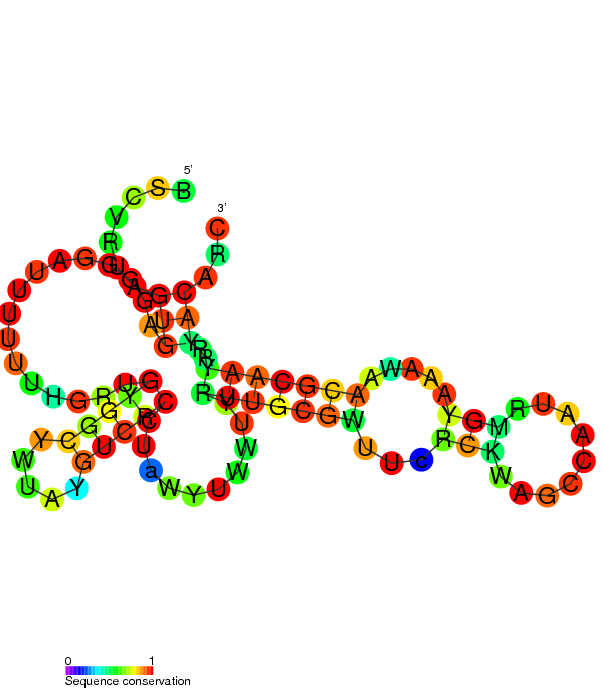
- Secondary structure of FstAT

Identifiers
- Symbol: fstAT
- Rfam: RF01797

Other data
- RNA type: Gene; antitoxin
- Domain(s): Enterococcus faecalis
- PDB structures: PDBe

Fst Type I toxin-antitoxin system

Identifiers
- Symbol: Fst_toxin
- Pfam: PF13955
- TCDB: 1.C.64
- OPM superfamily: 225
- OPM protein: 2kv5
Available protein structures:
- Pfam: structures / ECOD
- PDB: RCSB PDB; PDBe; PDBj
- PDBsum: structure summary

The par stability determinant is a 400 bp locus of the pAD1 plasmid which encodes a type I toxin-antitoxin system in Enterococcus faecalis. It was the first such plasmid addiction module to be found in gram-positive bacteria.

The par locus contains two genes: fst which encodes a 33-amino acid toxic protein and a gene for RNAII, the small RNA anti-toxin which inhibits fst translation. The two genes are found on opposite DNA strands and share a 5' region which is where they are thought to have an antisense interaction. Their RNA secondary structures have been predicted computationally, the complementary regions appear to be presented on exposed loops for interaction.

par maintains pAD1 by means of post-segregational killing (PSK). If a daughter cell does not inherit the par locus, the unstable RNAII will quickly degrade leaving the long-lived fst toxin to damage or kill the daughter cell.

== See also ==
- Hok/sok system
