= SprA1–SprA1as toxin–antitoxin system =

The SprA1/SPrA1as toxin/antitoxin system identified in Staphylococcus aureus, belongs to the Type I system encoding toxin protein: SprA1 and antitoxin RNA: SprA1as. The SprA1as postranscriptionally regulates SprA1 encoding small membrane damaging protein PepA1.
