= Gert Bange =

German structural biologist

- Born: 1 December 1977 (age 48); Görlitz, East Germany
- Education: Martin Luther University Halle/Saale, Ruprecht-Karls-University Heidelberg
- Known for: Research on molecular machines and bacterial stress adaptation
- Scientific career
- Fields: Structural biology, biochemistry
- Workplaces: Philipps-Universität Marburg; Max Planck Institute for Terrestrial Microbiology
- Thesis: (2007)
- Doctoral advisor: Irmgard Sinning

Gert Bange (born 1 December 1977 in Görlitz, East Germany) is a German structural biologist and biochemist. He is a professor of biochemistry and a vice-president for research at Philipps-Universität Marburg.

== Career ==
After graduating from high school in 1996 and doing his civil service in Halle/Saale, Bange studied biochemistry at Martin Luther University Halle/Saale from 1997 to 2002. In 2007, he received his doctorate in biochemistry and worked until 2012 at the Biochemistry Center of the Ruprecht-Karls-University Heidelberg under Irmgard Sinning. Bange then moved to the LOEWE Center for Synthetic Microbiology (SYNMIKRO) at Philipps University Marburg as an independent junior research group leader. Since 2018, he has been W3 Professor of Biochemistry at the Department of Chemistry of Philipps University and was Deputy Executive Director of SYNMIKRO from 2019 to 2022. He has also been a fellow at the Max Planck Institute for Terrestrial Microbiology in Marburg since 2021.

== Research ==
Bange works in the fields of structural biology and biochemistry and is interested in molecular deciphering of new biological mechanisms and their components. Research interests include the study of molecular machines, mechanisms of bacterial stress and environmental adaptation, and the interaction between microorganisms and their hosts. He serves on the editorial boards of the Journal for Biological Chemistry and the Journal of Bacteriology. Bange is on the board of the Initiative Biotechnologie und Nanotechnologie e.V. and was a member of the Senate of Philipps-Universität Marburg until 2022.

== Honors and awards (selection) ==
- 2021 ERC Advanced Grant "KIWIsome"
- 2020 Prize for excellent PhD Supervisor of the Philipps-University Marburg
- 2018 Winner of the iGEM Competition (Overgrad, as Instructor of the Team)
- 2012 Fellowship of the Peter und Traudl Engelhorn Stiftung
