= Toxin-antitoxin database =

TADB

Content
- Description: Type 2 toxin-antitoxin loci
- Organisms: bacteria archaea.

Contact
- Research center: Shanghai Jiaotong University
- Laboratory: Laboratory of Microbial Metabolism and School of Life Sciences and Biotechnology
- Authors: Yucheng Shao
- Primary citation: Shao & al. (2011)
- Release date: 2010

Access
- Website: http://202.120.12.135/TADB2/

TADB is a database of Type 2 toxin-antitoxin loci in bacterial and archaeal genomes.

== See also ==
- Toxin-antitoxin system
