= CcdA–CcdB Type II Toxin–antitoxin system =

Bacterial system of proteins

CcdB Toxin of Type II Toxin-antitoxin system
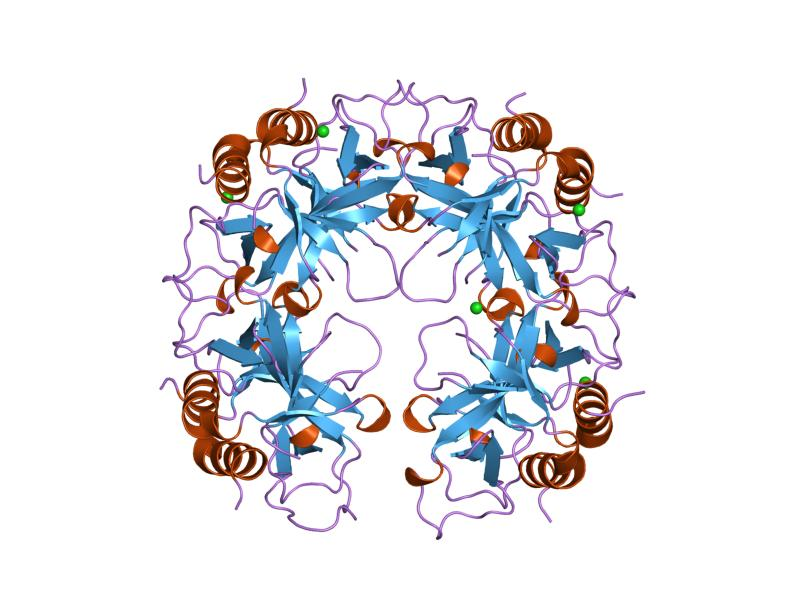
- CcdB, a topoisomerase toxin from E. coli

Identifiers
- Symbol: CcdB
- Pfam: PF01845
- InterPro: IPR002712
- SCOP2: 4vub / SCOPe / SUPFAM
Available protein structures:
- PDB: IPR002712 PF01845 (ECOD; PDBsum)
- AlphaFold: IPR002712; PF01845

CcdA Antitoxin of Type II Toxin-antitoxin system

Identifiers
- Symbol: CcdA
- Pfam: PF07362
- Pfam clan: CL0057
- InterPro: IPR009956
Available protein structures:
- PDB: IPR009956 PF07362 (ECOD; PDBsum)
- AlphaFold: IPR009956; PF07362

The CcdA/CcdB Type II Toxin-antitoxin system is one example of the bacterial toxin-antitoxin (TA) systems that encode two proteins, one a potent inhibitor of cell proliferation (toxin) and the other its specific antidote (antitoxin). These systems preferentially guarantee growth of plasmid-carrying daughter cells in a bacterial population by killing newborn bacteria that have not inherited a plasmid copy at cell division (post-segregational killing).

The ccd system (control of cell death) of the F plasmid encodes two proteins, the CcdB protein (101 amino acids; toxin) and the CcdA antidote (72 amino acids). The antidote prevents CcdB toxicity by forming a tight CcdA–CcdB complex.

== Mechanism of action ==
The target of CcdB is the GyrA subunit of DNA gyrase, an essential type II topoisomerase in Escherichia coli. Gyrase alters DNA topology by effecting a transient double-strand break in the DNA backbone, passing the double helix through the gate and resealing the gaps. The CcdB poison acts by trapping DNA gyrase in a cleaved complex with the gyrase A subunit covalently closed to the cleaved DNA, causing DNA breakage and cell death in a way closely related to quinolone antibiotics.

In absence of the antitoxin, the CcdB poison traps DNA-gyrase cleavable complexes, inducing breaks into DNA and cell death.

Regulation of the ccd operon by the CCdA/CCdB complex is dependent upon the ratio of the two molecules to each other in the complex: a (CcdA)2–(CcdB)2 complex binds the DNA of the operon thus repressing transcription, but when CcdB is in excess of CcdA de-repression occurs, whereas repression will occur when CcdA levels are greater than or equal to that of CcdB. As a model system, by ensuring an antidote–toxin ratio greater than one, this mechanism might prevent the harmful effect of CcdB in plasmid-containing bacteria.

== Comparison with parD ==
The Ccd and parD systems are found to be strikingly similar in terms of their structures and actions. The antitoxin protein of each system interacts with its cognate toxin to neutralise the activity of the toxin and in the process the complex of the two becomes an efficient transcription repressor.

== Use and availability ==
In recombinant DNA technology, the ccdB gene is widely used as a positive selection marker (e.g. the Invitrogen's Zero Background and Gateway cloning vectors). In August 2016, the CcdB positive selection technology falls completely within the public domain and is now fully free for personal or commercial use. Ccd operon was also used to stabilize plasmid for industrial use in the Staby(r) technology developed and commercialized by Delphi Genetics. In this technology, conventional antibiotic resistance gene is replaced by ccdA in the plasmid while ccdB gene is introduced into the chromosome of the bacteria. This technology allows to remove antibiotic resistance gene but is also able to reach higher yields in recombinant protein production and plasmid DNA. Some applications of this technology are patented and could need a license for commercial exploitation.
