= Heat shock response =

Type of cellular stress response

The heat shock response (HSR) is a cell stress response that increases the number of molecular chaperones to combat the negative effects on proteins caused by stressors such as increased temperatures, oxidative stress, and heavy metals. In a normal cell, proteostasis (protein homeostasis) must be maintained because proteins are the main functional units of the cell. Many proteins take on a defined configuration in a process known as protein folding in order to perform their biological functions. If these structures are altered, critical processes could be affected, leading to cell damage or death. The heat shock response can be employed under stress to induce the expression of heat shock proteins (HSPs), many of which are molecular chaperones, that help prevent or reverse protein misfolding and provide an environment for proper folding.

Protein folding is already challenging due to the crowded intracellular space where aberrant interactions can arise; it becomes more difficult when environmental stressors can denature proteins and cause even more non-native folding to occur. If the work by molecular chaperones is not enough to prevent incorrect folding, the protein may be degraded by the proteasome or autophagy to remove any potentially toxic aggregates. Misfolded proteins, if left unchecked, can lead to aggregation that prevents the protein from moving into its proper conformation and eventually leads to plaque formation, which may be seen in various diseases. Heat shock proteins induced by the HSR can help prevent protein aggregation that is associated with common neurodegenerative diseases such as Alzheimer's, Huntington's, or Parkinson's disease.

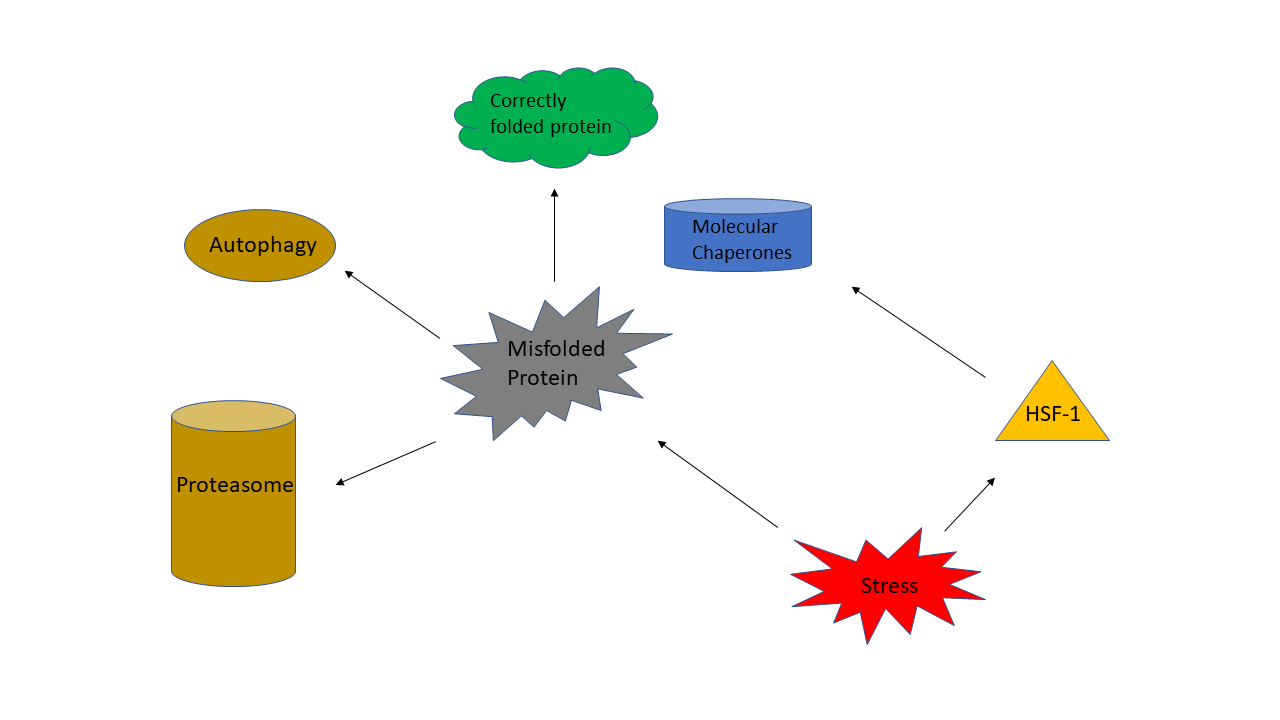
The diagram depicts actions taken when a stress is introduced to the cell. Stress will induce HSF-1 and cause proteins to misfold. Molecular chaperones will aid these proteins to fold correctly or if the degree of misfolding is too severe, the protein will be eliminated through the proteasome or autophagy.

== Induction of the heat shock response ==
With the introduction of environmental stressors, the cell must be able to maintain proteostasis. Acute or chronic subjection to these harmful conditions elicits a cytoprotective response to promote stability to the proteome. HSPs (e.g. HSP70, HSP90, HSP60, etc.) are present under normal conditions but under heat stress, they are upregulated by the transcription factor heat shock factor 1 (HSF1). There are four different transcription factors found in vertebrates (HSF 1–4) where the main regulator of HSPs is HSF1, while σ^{32} is the heat shock transcription factor in E. coli. When not bound to DNA, HSF1 is in a monomeric state where it is inactive and negatively regulated by chaperones. When a stress occurs, these chaperones are released due to the presence of denatured proteins and various conformational changes to HSF1 cause it to undergo nuclear localization where it becomes active through trimerization. Newly trimerized HSF1 will bind to heat shock elements (HSE) located in promoter regions of different HSPs to activate transcription of HSP mRNA. The mRNA will eventually be transcribed and comprise the upregulated HSPs that can alleviate the stress at hand and restore proteostasis. HSF1 will also regulate expression of HSPs through epigenetic modifications. The HSR will eventually attenuate as HSF1 returns to its monomeric form, negatively regulated through association with HSP70 and HSP90 along with additional post-translational modifications. The HSR is not only involved with increasing transcription levels of HSPs; other facets include stress-induced mRNA stability preventing errors in mRNA and enhanced control during translation to thwart misfolding.

== Molecular chaperones ==
Molecular chaperones are typically referred to as proteins that associate with and help other proteins reach a native conformation while not being present in the end state. Chaperones bind to their substrate (i.e. a misfolded protein) in an ATP-dependent manner to perform a specific function. Exposed hydrophobic residues are a major problem with regards to protein aggregation because they can interact with one another and form hydrophobic interactions. It is the job of chaperones to prevent this aggregation by binding to the residues or providing proteins a "safe" environment to fold properly. Heat shock proteins are also believed to play a role in the presentation of pieces of proteins (or peptides) on the cell surface to help the immune system recognize diseased cells. The major HSPs involved in the HSR include HSP70, HSP90, and HSP60. Chaperones include the HSP70s and HSP90s while HSP60s are considered to be chaperonins.

The HSP70 chaperone family is the main HSP system within cells, playing a key role in translation, post-translation, prevention of aggregates and refolding of aggregated proteins. When a nascent protein is being translated, HSP70 is able to associate with the hydrophobic regions of the protein to prevent faulty interactions until translation is complete. Post-translational protein folding occurs in a cycle where the protein becomes bound/released from the chaperone allowing burying hydrophobic groups and aiding in overcoming the energy needed to fold in a timely fashion. HSP70 plays a part in de-aggregating proteins using the aforementioned mechanism; the chaperone will bind to exposed hydrophobic residues and either partially or fully disassemble the protein, allowing HSP70 to assist in the proper refolding. When proteins are beyond the point of refolding, HSP70s can help direct these potentially toxic aggregates to be degraded by the proteasome or through autophagy. HSP90s are parallel to HSP70s with respect to the refolding or proteins and use in protein clearance. One difference between the two HSPs is HSP90s ability to keep proteins in an unfolded yet stable configuration until a signal causes the protein to translocate and complete its folding.

Sometimes, HSP70 is unable to effectively aid a protein in reaching its final 3-D structure; The main reason being the thermodynamic barriers for folding are too high for the chaperone to meet. Because the intracellular space is very crowded, sometimes proteins need an isolated space to prevent aberrant interactions between other proteins, which is provided by chaperonins or HSP60s . HSP60s are barrel shaped and suited to bind to the hydrophobic residues of proteins. Once a cap binds to the chaperonin, the protein is free within the barrel to undergo hydrophobic collapse and reach a stable conformation. Once the cap is removed, the protein can either be correctly folded and move on to perform its function or return to a HSP if it is still not folded accurately. These chaperones function to remove aggregation and significantly speed up protein folding.

== Discovery ==
Discovery of the heat shock response is attributed to Italian geneticist Ferruccio Ritossa, who observed changes called chromosomal "puffs" in response to heat exposure while working with the polytene chromosomes of Drosophila. By his own account, the discovery was the serendipitous result of unintentional elevated temperature in a laboratory incubator. Ritossa's observations, reported in 1962, were later described as "the first known environmental stress acting directly on gene activity" but were not initially widely cited. The significance of these observations became clearer in the 1970s, as a distinct class of heat shock proteins were discovered in the laboratory of Herschel K. Mitchell, and as heat shock responses were reported in other organisms and came to be recognized as universal.

== See also ==
- Bacterial stress response
