= UDP-N-acetylglucosamine kinase =

Class of enzymes

Identifiers
- EC no.: 2.7.1.176

Databases
- IntEnz: IntEnz view
- BRENDA: BRENDA entry
- ExPASy: NiceZyme view
- KEGG: KEGG entry
- MetaCyc: metabolic pathway
- PRIAM: profile
- PDB structures: RCSB PDB PDBe PDBsum
Search
- PMC: articles
- PubMed: articles
- NCBI: proteins

UDP-N-acetylglucosamine kinase (EC 2.7.1.176, UNAG kinase, zeta toxin, toxin PezT, ATP:UDP-N-acetyl-D-glucosamine 3'-phosphotransferase) is an enzyme with systematic name ATP:UDP-N-acetyl-alpha-D-glucosamine 3'-phosphotransferase. This enzyme catalyses the following chemical reaction

ATP + UDP-N-acetyl-alpha-D-glucosamine $\rightleftharpoons$ ADP + UDP-N-acetyl-alpha-D-glucosamine 3'-phosphate

The phosphorylation of UDP-N-acetyl-D-glucosamine causes the inhibition of enzyme EC 2.5.1.7, UDP-N-acetylglucosamine 1-carboxyvinyltransferase.

These enzymes are found as part of plasmid-encoded and chromosomal bacterial toxin-antitoxin systems.
