= PtaRNA1 =

Family of non-coding RNAs

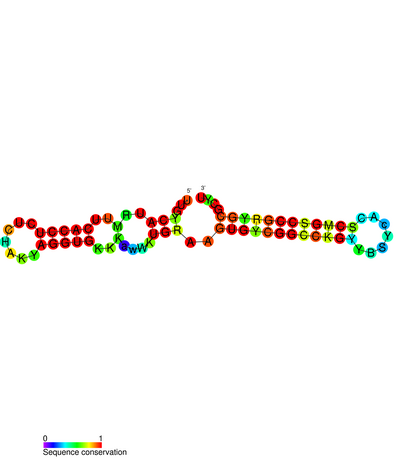
- PtaRNA1 consensus secondary structure

Identifiers
- Symbol: PtaRNA1
- Rfam: RF01811

Other data
- RNA type: antisense
- Domain(s): Gammaproteobacteria
- PDB structures: PDBe

ptaRNA1_toxin

Identifiers
- Symbol: Toxin to PtaRNA1 antitoxin, of type 1 toxin-antitoxin system
- Pfam: PF12703
Available protein structures:
- Pfam: structures / ECOD
- PDB: RCSB PDB; PDBe; PDBj
- PDBsum: structure summary

PtaRNA1 (plasmid transferred antisense RNA) is a family of non-coding RNAs. Homologs of PtaRNA1 can be found in the bacterial families, Betaproteobacteria and Gammaproteobacteria. In all cases the PtaRNA1 is located anti-sense to a short protein-coding gene. In Xanthomonas campestris pv. vesicatoria, this gene is annotated as XCV2162 and is included in the plasmid toxin family of proteins.

== Distribution and function ==
Both PtaRNA1 and the adjacent coding gene, which only appear only in combination, have an erratic phylogenetic distribution. The distribution of ptaRNA1 is not congruent with the phylogeny of the host species as it is with other sRNA families such as Yfr1 and Yfr2. This indicates that ptaRNA1 has undergone frequent horizontal gene transfer. These observations are in accordance with those made of Type I toxin-antitoxin systems.

In type I toxin-antitoxin systems, the gene expression of a toxic protein is regulated by a small non-coding RNA. Type I toxin-antitoxin loci are frequently found in both prokaryotic chromosomes and plasmids. The secondary structure of ptaRNA1 is very similar to the E. coli FinP antisense RNA. FinP is an antisense regulator of the cis-acting RNA element Traj, the structural similarities imply ptaRNA1 is likely to be part of a complex regulatory network.

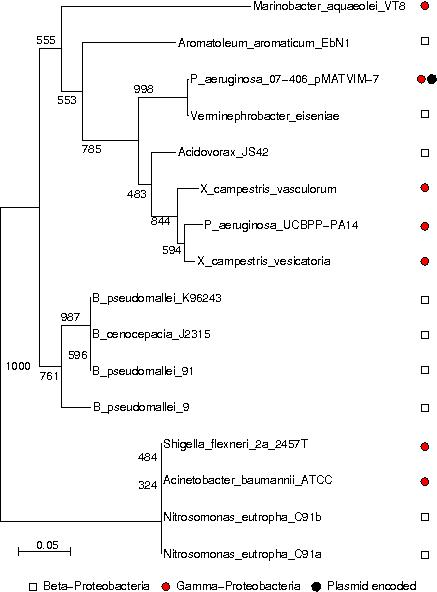
A phylogenetic tree based on PtaRNA1 seed alignment. Class of the “host” species is shown by the symbols on the right hand side. Numbers indicate bootstrap values of the inner nodes.

== See also ==
- Hok/sok system
- Toxin-antitoxin system
