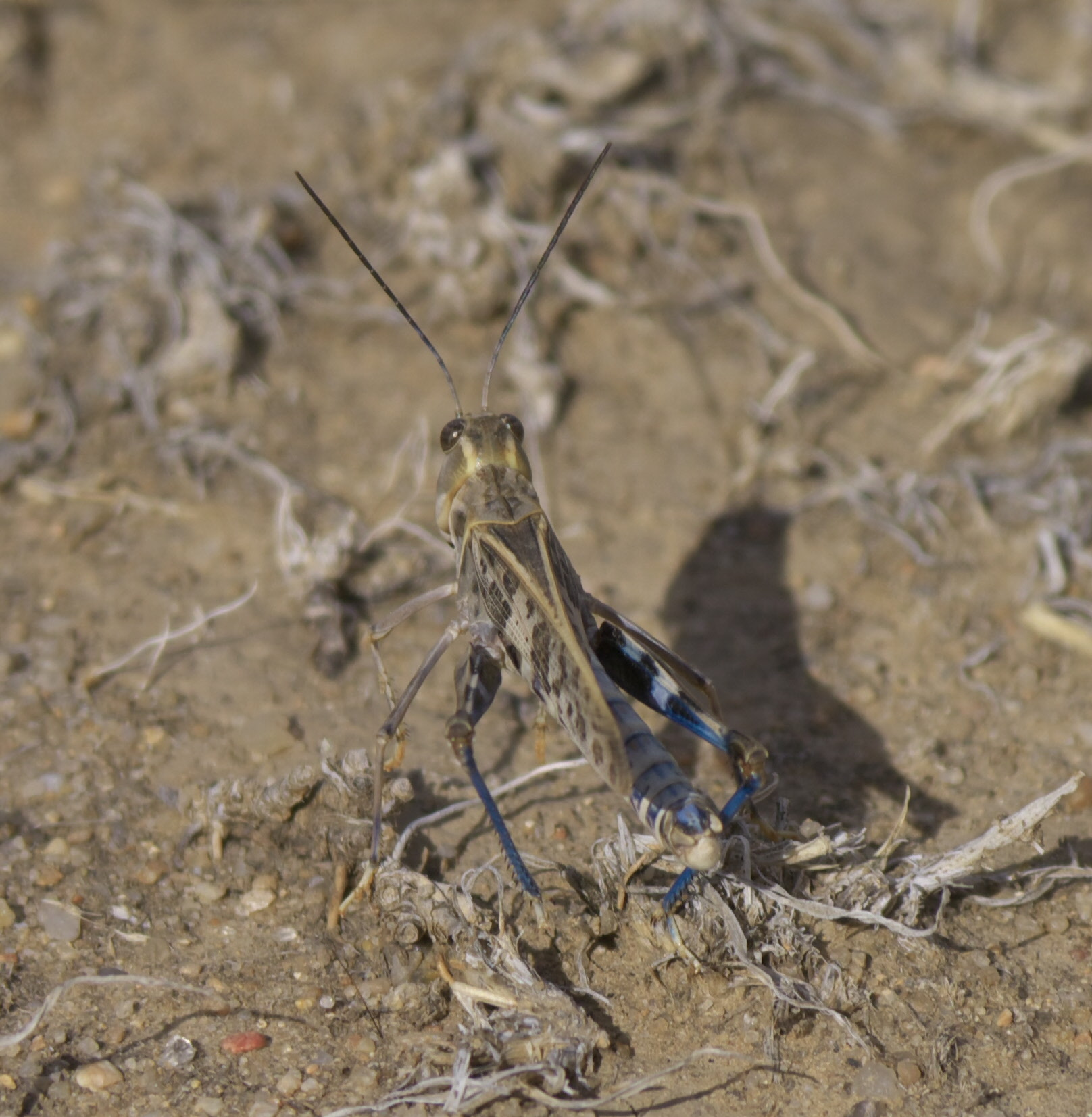

Scientific classification
- Domain: Eukaryota
- Kingdom: Animalia
- Phylum: Arthropoda
- Class: Insecta
- Order: Orthoptera
- Suborder: Caelifera
- Family: Acrididae
- Tribe: Psinidiini
- Genus: Metator
- Species: M. pardalinus

Binomial name
- Metator pardalinus (Saussure, 1884)

= Metator pardalinus =

Species of grasshopper

Metator pardalinus, known generally as the blue-legged grasshopper or pard grasshopper, is a species of band-winged grasshopper in the family Acrididae. It is found in North America.
