= Zeta toxin protein domain =

Zeta_toxin
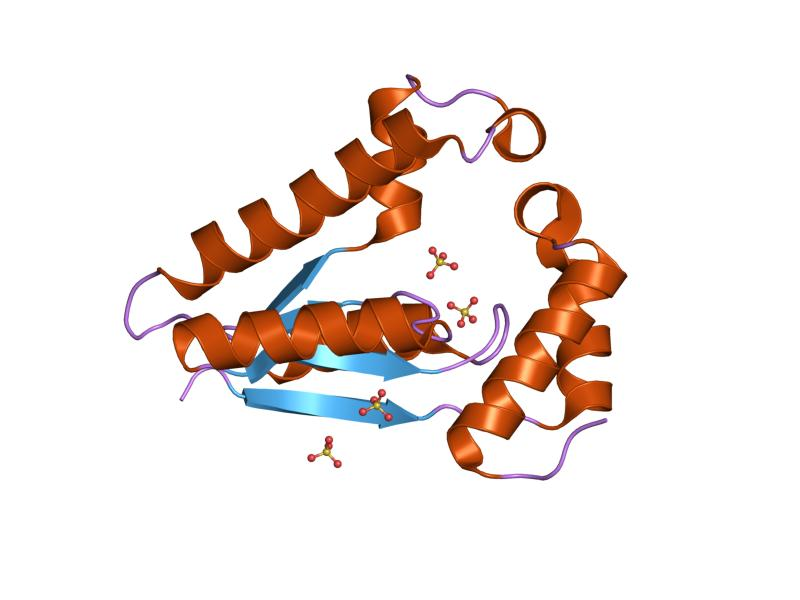
- structure and mechanism of t4 polynucleotide kinase

Identifiers
- Symbol: Zeta_toxin
- Pfam: PF06414
- Pfam clan: CL0023
- InterPro: IPR010488
- SCOP2: 1gvn / SCOPe / SUPFAM
- Membranome: 314
Available protein structures:
- PDB: IPR010488 PF06414 (ECOD; PDBsum)
- AlphaFold: IPR010488; PF06414

In molecular biology, the protein domain Zeta (ζ) toxin refers to a protein domain found in prokaryotes, which acts as a UDP-N-acetylglucosamine kinase. Its function is to inhibit cell wall biosynthesis and it may act as a bactericide in nature. It is also thought that Zeta toxin induces reversible protective dormancy and permeation to propidium iodide (PI).

== Mechanism ==
This protein family entry consists of several bacterial zeta toxin proteins. Zeta toxin is thought to be part of a postsegregational killing (PSK) system involved in the killing of plasmid-free cells. It relies on antitoxin/toxin systems that secure stable inheritance of low and medium copy number plasmids during cell division and kill cells that have lost the plasmid.

== Structure ==
The Zeta Toxin is folded like a phosphotransferase. This domain features an α/β structure and the central twisted β-sheet contains six β-strands. The first 5 strands are parallel but β-strand 6 is antiparallel and connected by a short loop to β-strand 5. α-Helices are inserted between and flank the β-strands.
