= SOS response =

Cell response to DNA damage

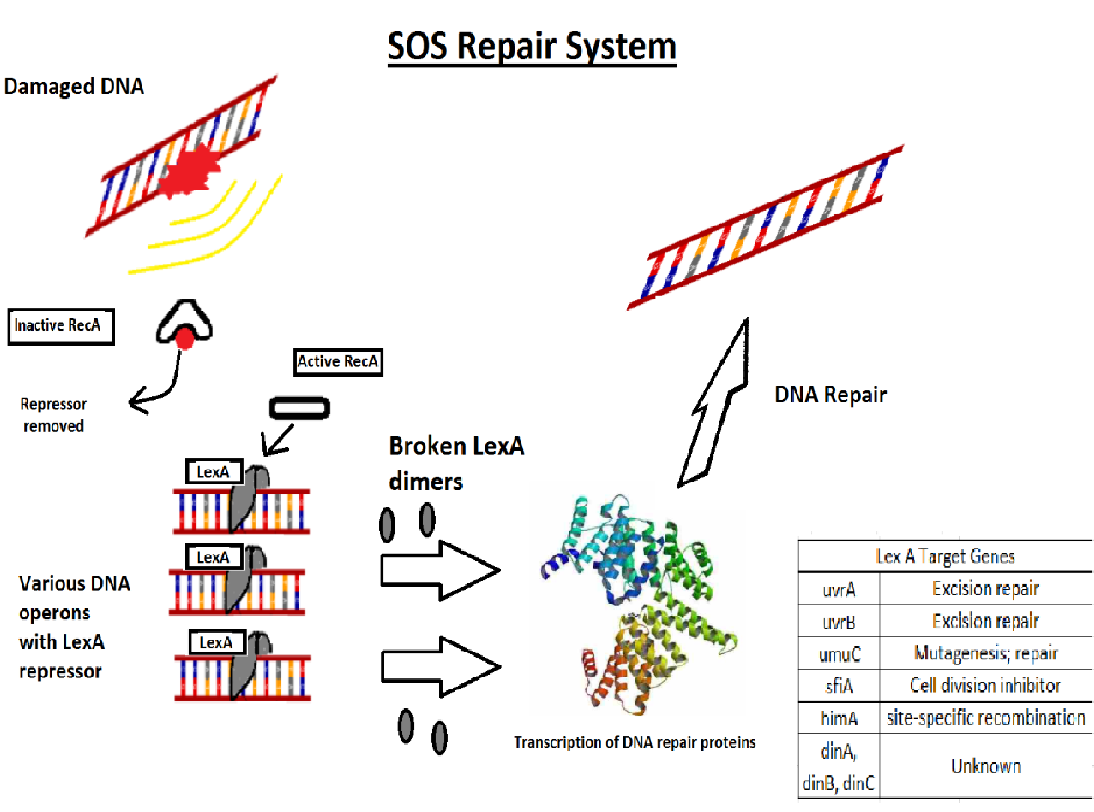
E. coli SOS System: DNA can be damaged by cross-linking agents, UV irradiation, alkylating agents, etc. Once damaged, RecA, a LexA protease, senses that damaged DNA and becomes activated by removing its repressor. Once the LexA dimer repressor is removed, the expression of LexA operon is autoregulatory. In addition to being a LexA protease, the RecA protein also catalyzes a few novel DNA reactions such as annealing of single-stranded DNA and transfer of strands. The SOS system has enhanced DNA-repair capacity, including excision and post-replication repair, enhanced mutagenesis and prophage induction. The system can also inhibit cell division and cell respiration.

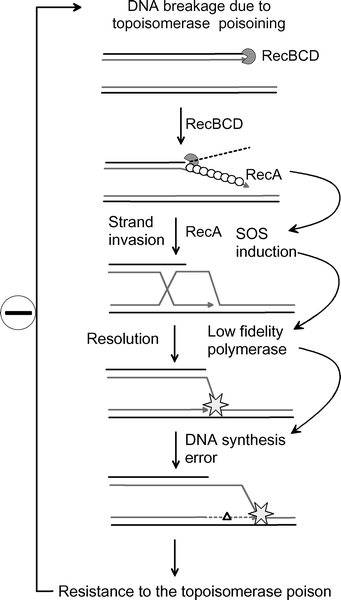
The SOS response has been proposed as a model for bacterial evolution of certain types of antibiotic resistance.

The SOS response is a global transcriptional response to DNA damage in prokaryotes, in which the cell cycle is arrested and DNA repair mechanisms (error-free as well as error-prone) are induced. The regulation of this response is driven by two proteins, RecA and LexA. The RecA protein, stimulated by single-stranded DNA, is involved in the inactivation of the repressor (LexA) of SOS response genes thereby inducing the response. It is an error-prone repair system that contributes significantly to DNA changes observed in a wide range of bacterial species.

== Discovery ==
The SOS response was articulated by Evelyn Witkin. Later, by characterizing the phenotypes of mutagenised E. coli, she and post doctoral student Miroslav Radman detailed the SOS response to UV radiation in bacteria. The SOS response to DNA damage was a seminal discovery because it was the first coordinated stress response to be elucidated.

== Mechanism ==
During normal growth, the SOS genes are under the repressor of the LexA protein. Under normal conditions, LexA binds to a consensus sequence (the SOS box) in the operator region of the SOS regulon genes. Some of these genes are expressed at certain levels even in the repressed state, according to the affinity of LexA for their SOS box. Activation of the SOS genes occurs after DNA damage by the accumulation of single stranded (ssDNA) regions generated at replication forks, where DNA polymerase is blocked. RecA forms a filament around these ssDNA regions in an ATP-dependent fashion, and becomes activated. The activated form of RecA interacts with the LexA repressor to facilitate the LexA repressor's self-cleavage from the operator.

Once the pool of LexA decreases, repression of the SOS genes goes down according to the level of LexA affinity for the SOS boxes. Operators that bind LexA weakly are the first to be fully expressed. In this way LexA can sequentially activate different mechanisms of repair. Genes having a weak SOS box (such as lexA, recA, uvrA, uvrB, and uvrD) are fully induced in response to even weak SOS-inducing treatments. Thus the first SOS repair mechanism to be induced is nucleotide excision repair (NER), whose aim is to fix DNA damage without commitment to a full-fledged SOS response. If, however, NER does not suffice to fix the damage, the LexA concentration is further reduced, so the expression of genes with stronger LexA boxes (such as sulA, umuD, umuC – these are expressed late) is induced. SulA stops cell division by binding to FtsZ, the initiating protein in this process. This causes filamentation, and the induction of UmuDC-dependent mutagenic repair. As a result of these properties, some genes may be partially induced in response to even endogenous levels of DNA damage, while other genes appear to be induced only when high or persistent DNA damage is present in the cell.

In Caulobacter however, LexA box properties have been shown to be insufficient to explain the temporal dynamics of the SOS response. Instead, intrinsic promoter strength has been suggested to determine this order.

== Antibiotic resistance ==
Research has shown that the SOS response system can lead to mutations which can lead to resistance to antibiotics. The increased rate of mutation during the SOS response is caused by three low-fidelity DNA polymerases: Pol II, Pol IV and Pol V. Researchers are now targeting these proteins with the aim of creating drugs that prevent SOS repair. By doing so, the time needed for pathogenic bacteria to evolve antibiotic resistance could be extended, thus improving the long term viability of some antibiotic drugs.

As well as genetic resistance the SOS response can also promote phenotypic resistance. Here, the genome is preserved whilst other non-genetic factors are altered to enable the bacteria to survive. The SOS dependent tisB-istR toxin-antitoxin system has, for example, been linked to DNA damage-dependent persister cell induction.

== Genotoxicity testing ==
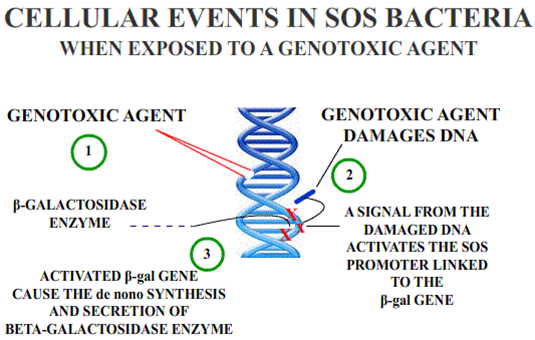
Overview of the use of the SOS response for genotoxicity testing.

In Escherichia coli, different classes of DNA-damaging agents can initiate the SOS response, as described above. Taking advantage of an operon fusion placing the lac operon (responsible for producing beta-galactosidase, a protein which degrades lactose) under the control of an SOS-related protein, a simple colorimetric assay for genotoxicity is possible. A lactose analog is added to the bacteria, which is then degraded by beta-galactosidase, thereby producing a colored compound which can be measured quantitatively through spectrophotometry. The degree of color development is an indirect measure of the beta-galactosidase produced, which itself is directly related to the amount of DNA damage.

The E. coli are further modified in order to have a number of mutations including a uvrA mutation which renders the strain deficient in excision repair, increasing the response to certain DNA-damaging agents, as well as an rfa mutation, which renders the bacteria lipopolysaccharide-deficient, allowing better diffusion of certain chemicals into the cell in order to induce the SOS response. Commercial kits which measures the primary response of the E. coli cell to genetic damage are available and may be highly correlated with the Ames Test for certain materials.

== Cyanobacteria ==
Cyanobacteria, the only prokaryotes capable of oxygen evolving photosynthesis, are major producers of the Earth's oxygenic atmosphere. The marine cyanobacteria Prochlorococcus and Synechococcus appear to have an E. coli like SOS system for repair of DNA, since they encode genes homologous to key E. coli SOS genes such as lexA and sulA.

== Additional images ==
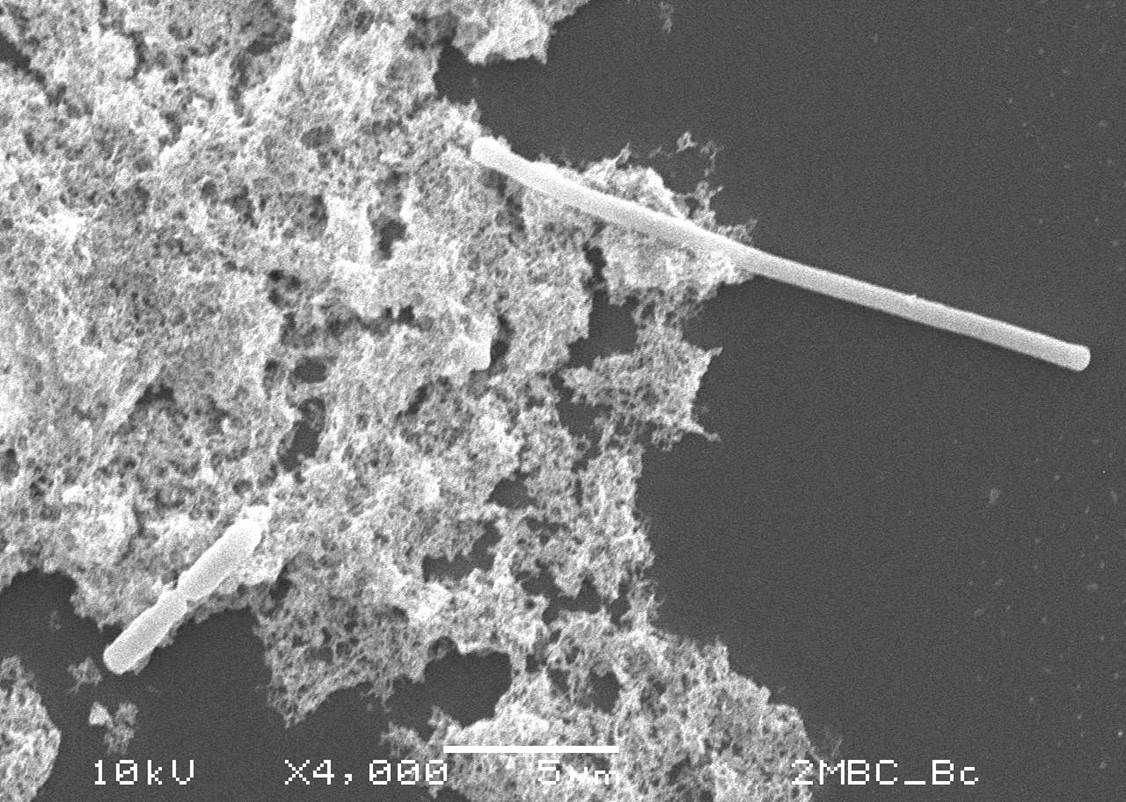
The SOS response inhibits septum formation until bacterial DNA can be repaired and is observable as filamentation when cells are examined by microscopy (top right of image).

== See also ==
- Induction of lysis in lambda phage
