= LexA repressor =

Prokaryotic protein

LexA DNA binding domain
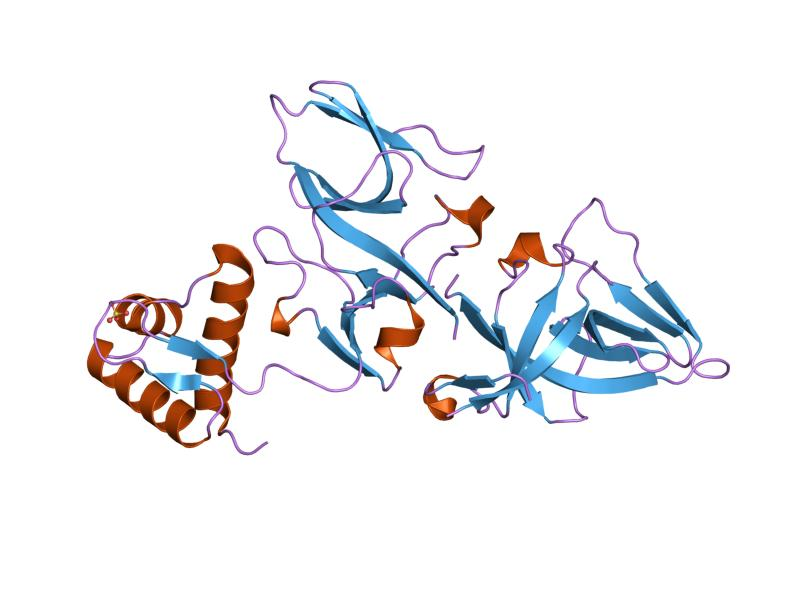
- lexa s119a mutant

Identifiers
- Symbol: LexA_DNA_bind
- Pfam: PF01726
- Pfam clan: CL0123
- InterPro: IPR006199
- SCOP2: 1leb / SCOPe / SUPFAM
Available protein structures:
- PDB: IPR006199 PF01726 (ECOD; PDBsum)
- AlphaFold: IPR006199; PF01726

The LexA repressor or LexA (Locus for X-ray sensitivity A) is a transcriptional repressor (EC 3.4.21.88) that represses SOS response genes coding primarily for error-prone DNA polymerases, DNA repair enzymes and cell division inhibitors. LexA forms de facto a two-component regulatory system with RecA, which senses DNA damage at stalled replication forks, forming monofilaments and acquiring an active conformation capable of binding to LexA and causing LexA to cleave itself, in a process called autoproteolysis.

LexA polypeptides contains a two domains: a DNA-binding domain and a dimerization domain. The dimerization domain binds to other LexA polypeptides to form dumbbell shaped dimers. The DNA-binding domain is a variant form of the helix-turn-helix DNA binding motif, and is usually located at the N-terminus of the protein. This domain is bound to an SOS box upstream of SOS response genes until DNA damage stimulates autoproteolysis.

== Clinical significance ==
DNA damage can be inflicted by the action of antibiotics, bacteriophages, and UV light. Of potential clinical interest is the induction of the SOS response by antibiotics, such as ciprofloxacin. Bacteria require topoisomerases such as DNA gyrase or topoisomerase IV for DNA replication. Antibiotics such as ciprofloxacin are able to prevent the action of these molecules by attaching themselves to the gyrate–DNA complex, leading to replication fork stall and the induction of the SOS response. The expression of error-prone polymerases under the SOS response increases the basal mutation rate of bacteria. While mutations are often lethal to the cell, they can also enhance survival. In the specific case of topoisomerases, some bacteria have mutated one of their amino acids so that the ciprofloxacin can only create a weak bond to the topoisomerase. This is one of the methods that bacteria use to become resistant to antibiotics. Ciprofloxacin treatment can therefore potentially lead to the generation of mutations that may render bacteria resistant to ciprofloxacin. In addition, ciprofloxacin has also been shown to induce via the SOS response dissemination of virulence factors and antibiotic resistance determinants, as well as the activation of integron integrases, potentially increasing the likelihood of acquisition and dissemination of antibiotic resistance by bacteria.

Impaired LexA proteolysis has been shown to interfere with ciprofloxacin resistance. This offers potential for combination therapy that combines quinolones with strategies aimed at interfering with the action of LexA, either directly or via RecA.
