= Toxin–antitoxin system =

Biological process

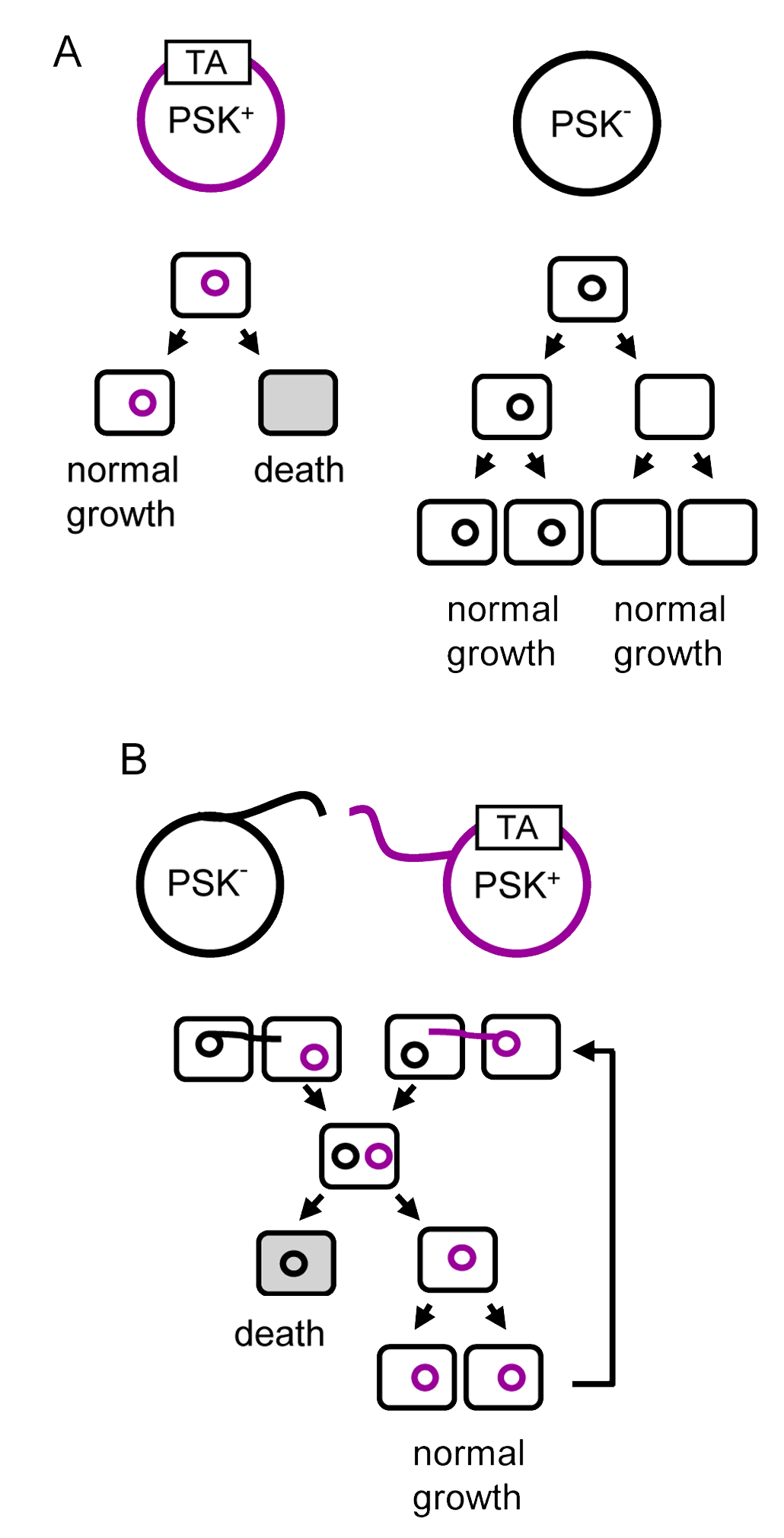
(A) The vertical gene transfer of a toxin-antitoxin system. (B) Horizontal gene transfer of a toxin-antitoxin system. PSK stands for post-segregational killing and TA represents a locus encoding a toxin and an antitoxin.

A toxin-antitoxin system consists of a "toxin" and a corresponding "antitoxin", usually encoded by closely linked genes. The toxin is usually a protein, while the antitoxin can be a protein or an RNA. Toxin-antitoxin systems are widely distributed in prokaryotes, and organisms often have them in multiple copies. When these systems are contained on plasmids – transferable genetic elements – they ensure that only the daughter cells that inherit the plasmid survive after cell division. If the plasmid is absent in a daughter cell, the unstable antitoxin is degraded and the stable toxic protein kills the new cell; this is known as 'post-segregational killing' (PSK).

Toxin-antitoxin systems are typically classified according to how the antitoxin neutralises the toxin. In a type I toxin-antitoxin system, the translation of messenger RNA (mRNA) that encodes the toxin is inhibited by the binding of a small non-coding RNA antitoxin that binds the toxin mRNA. The toxic protein in a type II system is inhibited post-translationally by the binding of an antitoxin protein. Type III toxin-antitoxin systems consist of a small RNA that binds directly to the toxin protein and inhibits its activity. There are also types IV, V and VI, which are less common. Toxin-antitoxin genes are often inherited through horizontal gene transfer and are associated with pathogenic bacteria, having been found on plasmids conferring antibiotic resistance and virulence.

Chromosomal toxin-antitoxin systems also exist, some of which are thought to perform cell functions such as responding to stresses, causing cell cycle arrest and bringing about programmed cell death. In evolutionary terms, toxin-antitoxin systems can be considered selfish DNA in that the purpose of the systems are to replicate, regardless of whether they benefit the host organism or not. Some have proposed adaptive theories to explain the evolution of toxin-antitoxin systems; for example, chromosomal toxin-antitoxin systems could have evolved to prevent the inheritance of large deletions of the host genome. Toxin-antitoxin systems have several biotechnological applications, such as maintaining plasmids in cell lines, targets for antibiotics, and as positive selection vectors.

== Biological functions ==
=== Stabilization and fitness of mobile DNA ===
As stated above, toxin-antitoxin systems are well characterized as plasmid addiction modules. It was also proposed that toxin-antitoxin systems have evolved as plasmid exclusion modules. A cell that carries two plasmids from the same incompatibility group will eventually generate two daughter cells carrying either plasmid. Should one of these plasmids encode for a TA system, its "displacement" by another TA-free plasmid system will prevent its inheritance and thus induce post-segregational killing. This theory was corroborated through computer modelling. Toxin-antitoxin systems can also be found on other mobile genetic elements such as conjugative transposons and temperate bacteriophages and could be implicated in the maintenance and competition of these elements.

=== Genome stabilization ===
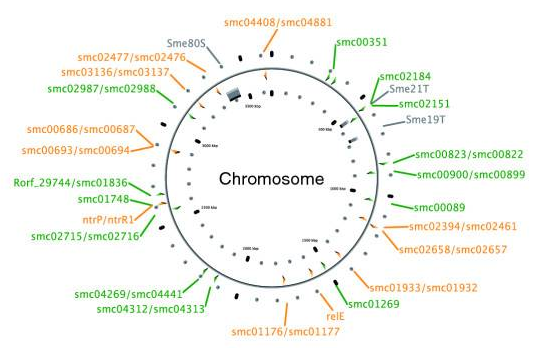
A chromosome map of Sinorhizobium meliloti, with its 25 chromosomal toxin-antitoxin systems. Orange-labelled loci are confirmed TA systems and green labels show putative systems.

Toxin-antitoxin systems could prevent harmful large deletions in a bacterial genome, though arguably deletions of large coding regions are fatal to a daughter cell regardless. In Vibrio cholerae, multiple type II toxin-antitoxin systems located in a super-integron were shown to prevent the loss of gene cassettes.

=== Altruistic cell death ===
mazEF, a toxin-antitoxin locus found in E. coli and other bacteria, was proposed to induce programmed cell death in response to starvation, specifically a lack of amino acids. This would release the cell's contents for absorption by neighbouring cells, potentially preventing the death of close relatives, and thereby increasing the inclusive fitness of the cell that perished. This would be an example of altruism and how bacterial colonies could resemble multicellular organisms. However, the "mazEF-mediated PCD" has largely been refuted by several studies.

=== Stress tolerance ===
Another theory states that chromosomal toxin-antitoxin systems are designed to be bacteriostatic rather than bactericidal. RelE, for example, is a global inhibitor of translation, is induced during nutrient stress. By shutting down translation under stress, it could reduce the chance of starvation by lowering the cell's nutrient requirements. However, it was shown that several toxin-antitoxin systems, including relBE, do not give any competitive advantage under any stress condition.

=== Anti-addiction ===
It has been proposed that chromosomal homologues of plasmid toxin-antitoxin systems may serve as anti-addiction modules, which would allow progeny to lose a plasmid without suffering the effects of the toxin it encodes. For example, a chromosomal copy of the ccdA antitoxin encoded in the chromosome of Erwinia chrysanthemi is able to neutralize the ccdB toxin encoded on the F plasmid and thus, prevent toxin activation when such a plasmid is lost. Similarly, the ataR antitoxin encoded on the chromosome of E. coli O157:H7 is able to neutralize the ataT_{P} toxin encoded on plasmids found in other enterohemorrhagic E. coli.

=== Phage protection ===
Type III toxin-antitoxin (AbiQ) systems have been shown to protect bacteria from bacteriophages altruistically. During an infection, bacteriophages hijack transcription and translation, which could prevent antitoxin replenishment and release toxin, triggering what is called an "abortive infection". Similar protective effects have been observed with type I, type II, and type IV (AbiE) toxin-antitoxin systems.

Abortive initiation (Abi) can also happen without toxin-antitoxin systems, and many Abi proteins of other types exist. This mechanism serves to halt the replication of phages, protecting the overall population from harm.

=== Antimicrobial persistence ===
When bacteria are challenged with antibiotics, a small and distinct subpopulation of cells is able to withstand the treatment by a phenomenon dubbed as "persistence" (not to be confused with resistance). Due to their bacteriostatic properties, type II toxin-antitoxin systems have previously been thought to be responsible for persistence, by switching a fraction of the bacterial population to a dormant state. However, this hypothesis has been widely invalidated.

=== Selfish DNA ===
Toxin-antitoxin systems have been used as examples of selfish DNA as part of the gene centered view of evolution. It has been theorised that toxin-antitoxin loci serve only to maintain their own DNA, at the expense of the host organism. Thus, chromosomal toxin-antitoxin systems would serve no purpose and could be treated as "junk DNA". For example, the ccdAB system encoded in the chromosome of E. coli O157:H7 has been shown to be under negative selection, albeit at a slow rate due to its addictive properties.

== System types ==
=== Type I ===
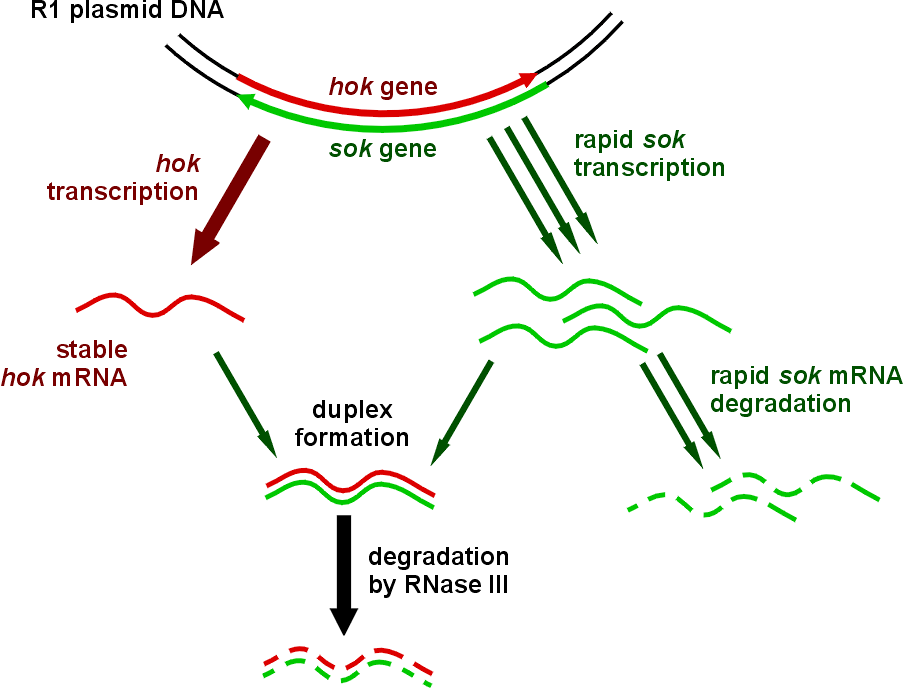
The hok/sok type I toxin-antitoxin system

Type I toxin-antitoxin systems rely on the base-pairing of complementary antitoxin RNA with the toxin mRNA. Translation of the mRNA is then inhibited either by degradation via RNase III or by occluding the Shine-Dalgarno sequence or ribosome binding site of the toxin mRNA. Often the toxin and antitoxin are encoded on opposite strands of DNA. The 5' or 3' overlapping region between the two genes is the area involved in complementary base-pairing, usually with between 19–23 contiguous base pairs.

Toxins of type I systems are small, hydrophobic proteins that confer toxicity by damaging cell membranes. Few intracellular targets of type I toxins have been identified, possibly due to the difficult nature of analysing proteins that are poisonous to their bacterial hosts. Also, the detection of small proteins has been challenging due to technical issues, a problem that remains to be solved with large-scale analysis.

Type I systems sometimes include a third component. In the case of the well-characterised hok/sok system, in addition to the hok toxin and sok antitoxin, there is a third gene, called mok. This open reading frame almost entirely overlaps that of the toxin, and the translation of the toxin is dependent on the translation of this third component. Thus the binding of antitoxin to toxin is sometimes a simplification, and the antitoxin in fact binds a third RNA, which then affects toxin translation.

==== Example systems ====
Toxin	Antitoxin	Notes	Ref.
hok	sok	The original and best-understood type I toxin-antitoxin system (pictured), which stabilises plasmids in a number of gram-negative bacteria	
fst	RNAII	The first type I system to be identified in gram-positive bacteria	
tisB	istR	A chromosomal system induced in the SOS response	
dinQ	agrB	A chromosomal system induced in the SOS response	
ldrD	rdlD	A chromosomal system in Enterobacteriaceae	
flmA	flmB	A hok/sok homologue, which also stabilises the F plasmid	
ibs	sib	Discovered in E. coli intergenic regions, the antitoxin was originally named QUAD RNA	
txpA/brnT	ratA	Ensures the inheritance of the skin element during sporulation in Bacillus subtilis	
symE	symR	A chromosomal system induced in the SOS response	
XCV2162	ptaRNA1	A system identified in Xanthomonas campestris with erratic phylogenetic distribution.	
timP	timR	A chromosomal system identified in Salmonella	
aapA1	isoA1	A type 1 TA module in Helicobacter pylori	
sprA1	sprA1as	Located within S. aureus small Pathogenicity island (SaPI). SprA1 encodes for a small cytotoxic peptide, PepA1, which disrupts both S. aureus membranes and host erythrocytes.	

=== Type II ===
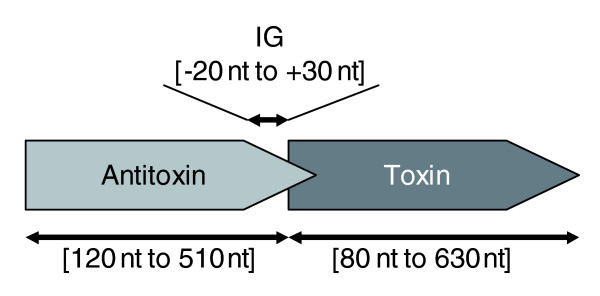
The genetic context of a typical type II toxin-antitoxin locus, produced during a bioinformatics analysis

Type II toxin-antitoxin systems are generally better-understood than type I. In this system a labile proteic antitoxin tightly binds and inhibits the activity of a stable toxin. The largest family of type II toxin-antitoxin systems is vapBC, which has been found through bioinformatics searches to represent between 37 and 42% of all predicted type II loci. Type II systems are organised in operons with the antitoxin protein typically being located upstream of the toxin, which helps to prevent expression of the toxin without the antitoxin. The proteins are typically around 100 amino acids in length, and exhibit toxicity in a number of ways: CcdB, for example, affects DNA replication by poisoning DNA gyrase whereas toxins from the MazF family are endoribonucleases that cleave cellular mRNAs, tRNAs or rRNAs at specific sequence motifs. The most common toxic activity is the protein acting as an endonuclease, also known as an interferase.

One of the key features of the TAs is the autoregulation. The antitoxin and toxin protein complex bind to the operator that is present upstream of the TA genes. This results in repression of the TA operon. The key to the regulation are (i) the differential translation of the TA proteins and (ii) differential proteolysis of the TA proteins. As explained by the "Translation-responsive model", the degree of expression is inversely proportional to the concentration of the repressive TA complex. The TA complex concentration is directly proportional to the global translation rate. The higher the rate of translation more TA complex and less transcription of TA mRNA. Lower the rate of translation, lesser the TA complex and higher the expression. Hence, the transcriptional expression of TA operon is inversely proportional to translation rate.

A third protein can sometimes be involved in type II toxin-antitoxin systems. In the case of the ω-ε-ζ (omega-epsilon-zeta) system, the omega protein is a DNA binding protein that negatively regulates the transcription of the whole system. Similarly, the paaR2 protein regulates the expression of the paaR2-paaA2-parE2 toxin-antitoxin system. Other toxin-antitoxin systems can be found with a chaperone as a third component. This chaperone is essential for proper folding of the antitoxin, thus making the antitoxin addicted to its cognate chaperone.

==== Example systems ====
Toxin	Antitoxin	Notes	Ref.
ccdB	ccdA	Found on the F plasmid of Escherichia coli	
parE	parD	Found in multiple copies in Caulobacter crescentus	
mazF	mazE	Found in E. coli and in chromosomes of other bacteria	
yafO	yafN	A system induced by the SOS response to DNA damage in E. coli	
hicA	hicB	Found in archaea and bacteria	
kid	kis	Stabilises the R1 plasmid and is related to the CcdB/A system	
ζ	ε	Found mostly in Gram-positive bacteria	
ataT	ataR	Found in enterohemorrhagic E. coli and Klebsiella spp.	

=== Type III ===
ToxN_toxin

Identifiers
- Symbol: ToxN, type III toxin-antitoxin system
- Pfam: PF13958
Available protein structures:
- PDB: PF13958 (ECOD; PDBsum)
- AlphaFold: PF13958

Type III toxin-antitoxin systems rely on direct interaction between a toxic protein and an RNA antitoxin. The toxic effects of the protein are neutralised by the RNA gene. One example is the ToxIN system from the bacterial plant pathogen Erwinia carotovora. The toxic ToxN protein is approximately 170 amino acids long and has been shown to be toxic to E. coli. The toxic activity of ToxN is inhibited by ToxI RNA, an RNA with 5.5 direct repeats of a 36 nucleotide motif (AGGTGATTTGCTACCTTTAAGTGCAGCTAGAAATTC). Crystallographic analysis of ToxIN has found that ToxN inhibition requires the formation of a trimeric ToxIN complex, whereby three ToxI monomers bind three ToxN monomers; the complex is held together by extensive protein-RNA interactions.

=== Type IV ===
Type IV toxin-antitoxin systems are similar to type II systems, because they consist of two proteins. Unlike type II systems, the antitoxin in type IV toxin-antitoxin systems counteracts the activity of the toxin, and the two proteins do not necessarily interact directly. DarTG1 and DarTG2 are type IV toxin-antitoxin systems that modify DNA. Their toxins add ADP-ribose to guanosine bases (DarT1 toxin) or thymidine bases (DarT2 toxin), and their antitoxins remove the toxic modifications (NADAR antitoxin from guanosine and DarG antitoxin from thymidine).

=== Type V ===
ghoST is a type V toxin-antitoxin system, in which the antitoxin (GhoS) cleaves the ghoT mRNA. This system is regulated by a type II system, mqsRA.

=== Type VI ===
socAB is a type VI toxin-antitoxin system that was discovered in Caulobacter crescentus. The antitoxin, SocA, promotes degradation of the toxin, SocB, by the protease ClpXP.

=== Type VII ===
Type VII has been proposed to include systems hha/tomB, tglT/takA and hepT/mntA, all of which neutralise toxin activity by post-translational chemical modification of amino acid residues.

=== Type VIII ===
Type VIII includes the system creTA. In this system, the antitoxin creA serves as a guide RNA for a CRISPR-Cas system. Due to incomplete complementarity between the creA guide and the creAT promoter, the Cas complex does not cleave the DNA, but instead remains at the site, where it blocks access by RNA polymerase, preventing expression of the creT toxin (a natural instance of CRISPRi). When expressed, the creT RNA will sequester the rare arginine codon tRNA^{UCU}, stalling translation and halting cell metabolism.

== Biotechnological applications ==
The biotechnological applications of toxin-antitoxin systems have begun to be realised by several biotechnology organisations. A primary usage is in maintaining plasmids in a large bacterial cell culture. In an experiment examining the effectiveness of the hok/sok locus, it was found that segregational stability of an inserted plasmid expressing beta-galactosidase was increased by between 8 and 22 times compared to a control culture lacking a toxin-antitoxin system. In large-scale microorganism processes such as fermentation, progeny cells lacking the plasmid insert often have a higher fitness than those who inherit the plasmid and can outcompete the desirable microorganisms. A toxin-antitoxin system maintains the plasmid thereby maintaining the efficiency of the industrial process.

Additionally, toxin-antitoxin systems may be a future target for antibiotics. Inducing suicide modules against pathogens could help combat the growing problem of multi-drug resistance.

Ensuring a plasmid accepts an insert is a common problem of DNA cloning. Toxin-antitoxin systems can be used to positively select for only those cells that have taken up a plasmid containing the inserted gene of interest, screening out those that lack the inserted gene. An example of this application comes from the ccdB-encoded toxin, which has been incorporated into plasmid vectors. The gene of interest is then targeted to recombine into the ccdB locus, inactivating the transcription of the toxic protein. Thus, cells containing the plasmid but not the insert perish due to the toxic effects of CcdB protein, and only those that incorporate the insert survive.

Another example application involves both the CcdB toxin and CcdA antitoxin. CcdB is found in recombinant bacterial genomes and an inactivated version of CcdA is inserted into a linearised plasmid vector. A short extra sequence is added to the gene of interest that activates the antitoxin when the insertion occurs. This method ensures orientation-specific gene insertion.

Genetically modified organisms must be contained in a pre-defined area during research. Toxin-antitoxin systems can cause cell suicide in certain conditions, such as a lack of a lab-specific growth medium they would not encounter outside of the controlled laboratory set-up.

== See also ==
- Toxin-antitoxin database
- Maternal effect dominant embryonic arrest (Medea)
