= Hok/sok system =

The hok/sok system is a postsegregational killing mechanism employed by the R1 plasmid in Escherichia coli. It was the first type I toxin-antitoxin pair to be identified through characterisation of a plasmid-stabilising locus. It is a type I system because the toxin is neutralised by a complementary RNA, rather than a partnered protein (type II toxin-antitoxin).

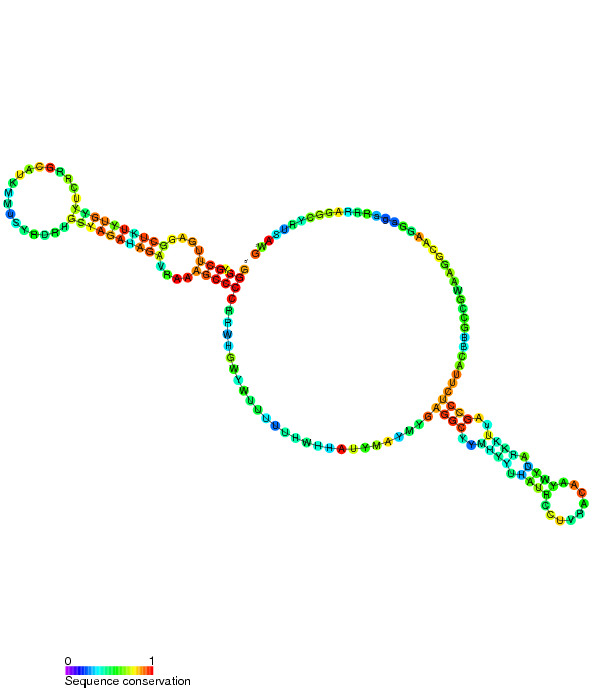
The conserved secondary structure of sok non-coding RNA transcript which binds with hok mRNA.

== Genes involved ==
The hok/sok system involves three genes:

- hok, host killing - a long lived (half-life 20 minutes) toxin
- sok, suppression of killing - a short lived (half-life 30 seconds) RNA antitoxin
- mok, modulation of killing - required for hok translation

HOK

Identifiers
- Symbol: HOK_GEF
- Pfam: PF01848
- InterPro: IPR000021
- PROSITE: PDOC00481
Available protein structures:
- Pfam: structures / ECOD
- PDB: RCSB PDB; PDBe; PDBj
- PDBsum: structure summary

== Killing mechanism ==
When E. coli undergoes cell division, the two daughter cells inherit the long-lived hok toxin from the parent cell. Due to the short half-life of the sok antitoxin, daughter cells inherit only small amounts and it quickly degrades.

If a daughter cell has inherited the R1 plasmid, it has inherited the sok gene and a strong promoter which brings about high levels of transcription. So much so that in an R1-positive cell, Sok transcript exists in considerable molar excess over Hok mRNA. Sok RNA then indirectly inhibits the translation of hok by inhibiting mok translation. There is a complementary region where sok transcript binds hok mRNA directly (pictured), but it does not occlude the Shine-Dalgarno sequence. Instead, sok RNA regulates the translation of the mok open reading frame, which nearly entirely overlaps that of hok. It is this translation-coupling which effectively allows sok RNA to repress the translation of hok mRNA.

The sok transcript forms a duplex with the leader region of hok mRNA and this is recognized by RNase III and degraded. The cleavage products are very unstable and soon decay.

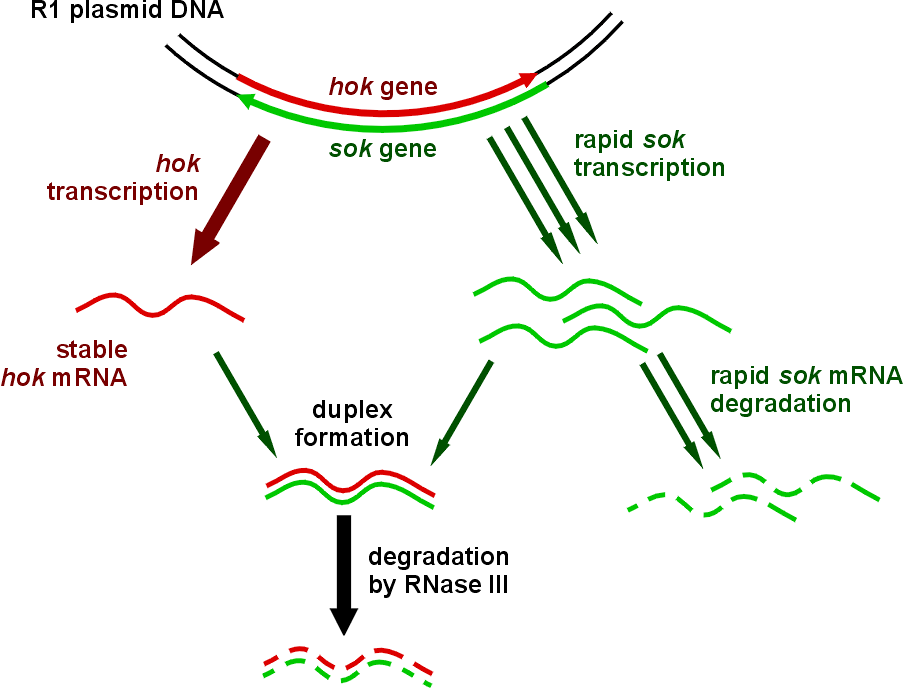
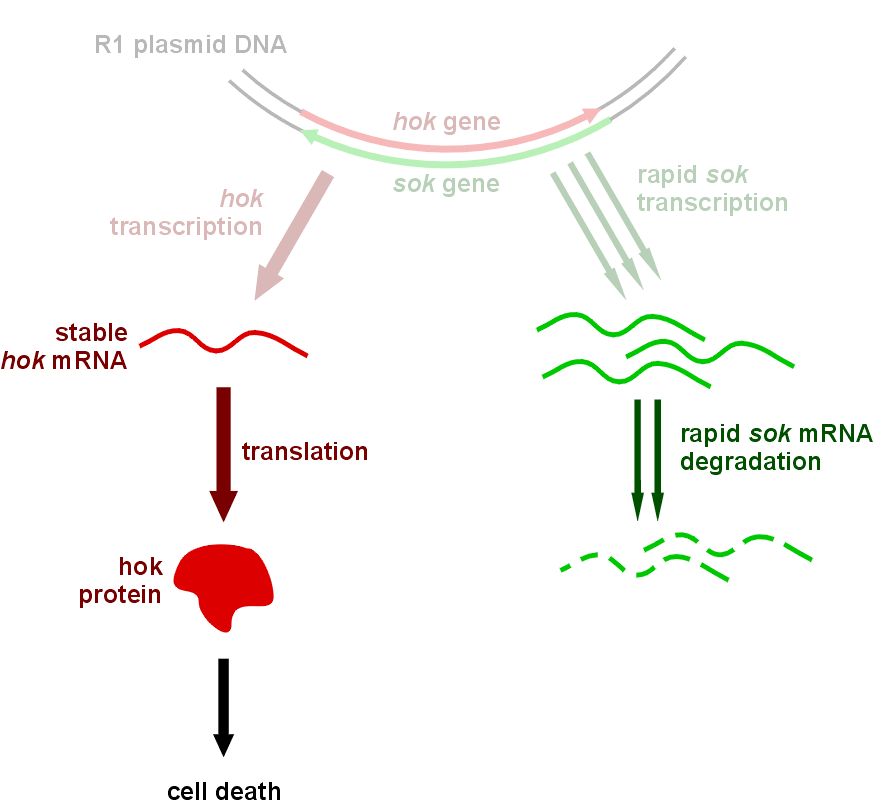

Daughter cells without a copy of the R1 plasmid die because they do not have the means to produce more sok antitoxin transcript to inhibit translation of the inherited hok mRNA. The killing system is said to be postsegregational (PSK), since cell death occurs after segregation of the plasmid.

== Hok toxin ==
The hok gene codes for a 52 amino acid toxic protein which causes cell death by depolarization of the cell membrane. It works in a similar way to holin proteins which are produced by bacteriophages before cell lysis.

== Homologous systems ==
=== Other plasmids ===
hok/sok homologues denoted flmA/B (FlmA is the protein toxin and FlmB RNA the antisense regulator) are carried on the F plasmid which operate in the same way to maintain the stability of the plasmid. The F plasmid contains another homologous toxin-antitoxin system called srnB.

The first type I toxin-antitoxin system to be found in gram-positive bacteria is the RNAI-RNAII system of the pAD1 plasmid in Enterococcus faecalis. Here, RNAI encodes a toxic protein Fst while RNAII is the regulatory sRNA.

=== Chromosomal toxin-antitoxin systems ===
In E. coli strain K-12 there are four long direct repeats (ldr) which encode short open reading frames of 35 codons organised in a homologous manner to the hok/sok system. One of the repeats encodes LdrD, a toxic protein which causes cell death. An unstable antisense RNA regulator (Rd1D) blocks the translation of the LdrD transcript. A mok homologue which overlaps each ldr loci has also been found.

IstR RNA works in a similar system in conjunction with the toxic TisB protein.

== See also ==
- par stability determinant
- Addiction module
- Sib RNA
- SymR RNA
- PtaRNA1
- RdlD RNA
- IstR RNA
- FlmB RNA
- RatA
