= Ribonuclease T =

Class of enzymes

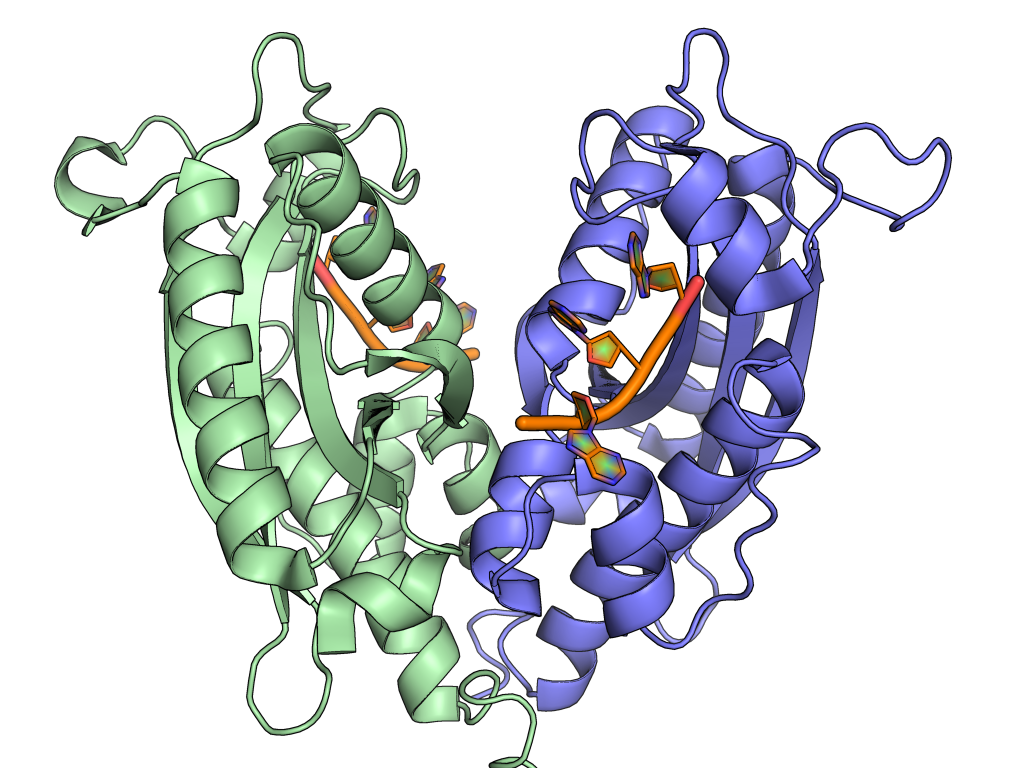
- A ribonuclease T dimer in complex with DNA (orange), from PDB ID 3NH1.

Identifiers
- Symbol: rnt
- Pfam: PF00929
- InterPro: IPR013520
- SMART: SM00479
Available protein structures:
- Pfam: structures / ECOD
- PDB: RCSB PDB; PDBe; PDBj
- PDBsum: structure summary

Ribonuclease T (RNase T, exonuclease T, exo T) is a ribonuclease enzyme involved in the maturation of transfer RNA and ribosomal RNA in bacteria, as well as in DNA repair pathways. It is a member of the DnaQ family of exonucleases and non-processively acts on the 3' end of single-stranded nucleic acids. RNase T is capable of cleaving both DNA and RNA, with extreme sequence specificity discriminating against cytosine at the 3' end of the substrate.

== Structure and mechanism ==
RNAse T catalyzes the removal of nucleotides from the 3' end of both RNA and DNA. It is inhibited by both double stranded DNA and RNA, as well as cytosine residues on the 3' end of RNA. Two cytosines at the 3' end of RNA appear to remove the activity of RNAse T entirely. This cytosine effect, however, is observed less with ssDNA. This lack of sequence specificity in ssDNA, combined with its ability to act on ssDNA close to a duplex region, has led to its use in creating blunt ends for DNA cloning. Structurally, RNAse T exists as an anti-parallel dimer and requires a divalent cation to function.

RNAse T phenylalinine residues interacting with a AAA trinucleotide. PDB 3V9X.

RNAse T is able to achieve its sequence specificity in RNA digestion via several aromatic residues that sandwich between nucleobases. The π-π interactions between four phenylalanine residues and the two nucleotides at the 3' end are different depending on the identify of the nucleotides, which changes the conformation and thus activity of the enzyme. An additional glutamic acid residue rotates to hydrogen bond to cytosine but not other bases, further increasing specificity.

== Function ==
A member of the larger DEDD family of exoribonucleases, RNAse T plays a key role in the maturation of tRNA as well as the maturation of the 5S and 23S rRNA domains. Specifically, RNAse T cleaves the 3' AMP residue from the 3' CCA sequences at the end of tRNA, which explains RNAse T's sequence specificity for stopping at the 3' CC sequence. Additionally, RNAse T can play a role in DNA repair by cleaving the 3' end of bulge DNA.

While E. coli can survive without RNAse T, its absence leads to slower life cycles and weakened response to starvation. Additionally, the presence of RNAse T in E. coli is linked to increased resistance to UV damage. It has been theorized that, while other ribonucleases can perform the function RNAse T, the fact that RNAse T is more effective at cleaving DNA and RNA near double-stranded regions means that alternatives are less effective. Despite the apparent usefulness of RNAse T, the enzyme is only found in gammaproteobacteria.

In E. coli, RNAse T is encoded by the rnt gene and is hypothesized to have diverged from the proofreading subunits of polymerase III during the emergence of gammaproteobacteria.
