= FAN1 =

Protein-coding gene in the species Homo sapiens

Identifiers
- Aliases: FAN1, KIAA1018, KMIN, MTMR15, hFANCD2/FANCI-associated nuclease 1, FANCD2 and FANCI associated nuclease 1
- External IDs: OMIM: 613534; MGI: 3045266; GeneCards: FAN1
Available structures
PDB	Ortholog search: PDBe RCSB
PDB	List of PDB id codes 4REA, 4REB, 4REC, 4RI8, 4RI9, 4RIA, 4RIB, 4RIC, 4RID, 4RY3
Enzyme activity
EC #	BRENDA	ExPASy	KEGG	MetaCyc
3.1.4.1	↗	↗	↗	↗

Gene location (Human)
Chr.	Chromosome 15 (human)
Band	15q13.3	Start	30,890,559 bp
Band	15q13.3	End	30,943,108 bp

Gene location (Mouse)
Chr.	Chromosome 7 (mouse)
Band	7|7 C	Start	63,996,506 bp
Band	7|7 C	End	64,023,843 bp
RNA expression pattern
Bgee	Human / Mouse (ortholog); Top expressed in: right hemisphere of cerebellum; gastrocnemius muscle; ventricular zone; body of pancreas; ganglionic eminence; muscle of thigh; right uterine tube; left ovary; gonad; right frontal lobe / Top expressed in: quadriceps femoris muscle; muscle of thigh; ganglionic eminence; epiblast; muscle tissue; white adipose tissue; liver; hypothalamus; skeletal muscle tissue; ventricular zone; More reference expression data
BioGPS	n/a
Gene ontology
Molecular function	DNA binding; hydrolase activity, acting on ester bonds; phosphodiesterase I activity; 5'-3' exonuclease activity; flap-structured DNA binding; metal ion binding; 5'-flap endonuclease activity; protein binding; nuclease activity; endonuclease activity; exonuclease activity; hydrolase activity; magnesium ion binding; ubiquitin-dependent protein binding; nucleic acid binding
Cellular component	nucleoplasm; intercellular bridge; nucleus; cytosol
Biological process	nucleotide-excision repair; cellular response to DNA damage stimulus; double-strand break repair via homologous recombination; nucleotide-excision repair, DNA incision; DNA repair; interstrand cross-link repair; nucleic acid phosphodiester bond hydrolysis
Sources:Amigo / QuickGO
Orthologs
Databases	NCBI: entry; OMA: entry
Species	Human	Mouse
Entrez	22909	330554
Ensembl	ENSG00000276787; ENSG00000198690	ENSMUSG00000033458
UniProt	Q9Y2M0	Q69ZT1
RefSeq (mRNA)	NM_001146094; NM_001146095; NM_001146096; NM_014967	NM_177893
RefSeq (protein)	NP_001139566; NP_001139567; NP_001139568; NP_055782	NP_808561
Location (UCSC)	Chr 15: 30.89 – 30.94 Mb	Chr 7: 64 – 64.02 Mb
PubMed search
- Wikidata
View/Edit Human	View/Edit Mouse

FANCD2/FANCI-associated nuclease 1 (KIAA1018) is an enzyme that in humans is encoded by the FAN1 gene. It is a structure dependent endonuclease. It is thought to play an important role in the Fanconi Anemia (FA) pathway.

== Structure ==
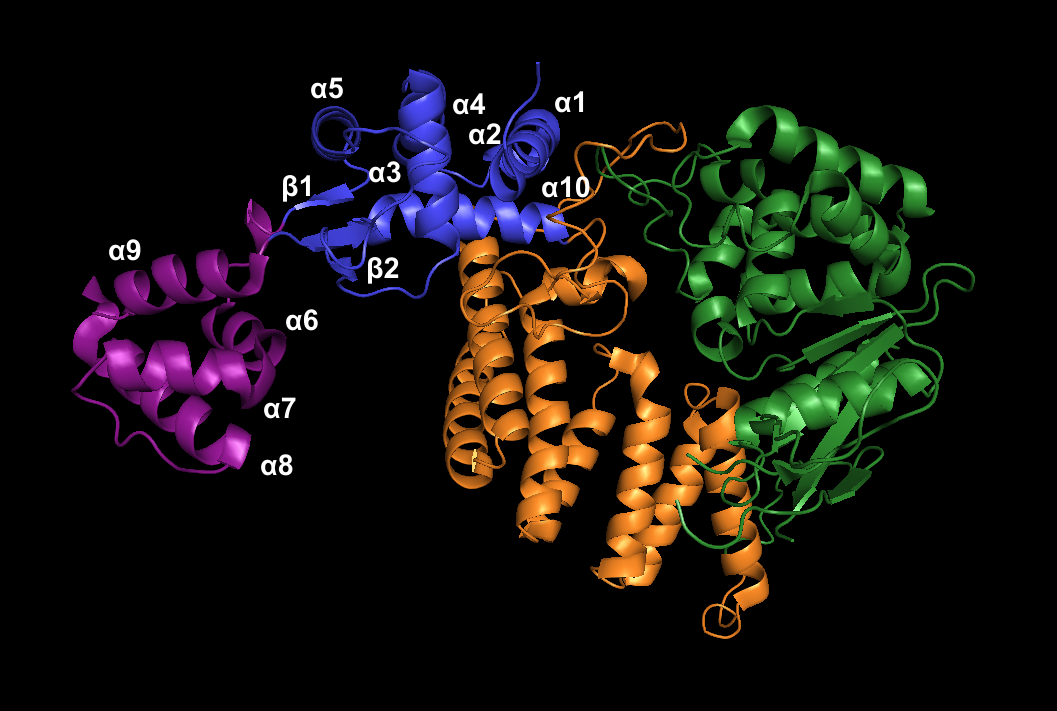
Figure 1. Color coded structure of FAN1 monomer with the SAP shown in blue and purple, TPR in orange, and VRR_Nuc in green. The secondary features of the SAP domain are labeled. Created in PyMOL from PDB structure 4RID.

FAN1 is a protein of 1017 amino acids. Several crystal structures of the residues 373-1017 have been characterized. This portion of FAN1 contains three domains: an SAP domain (primary-DNA binding domain), a TPR domain (mediating interdomain interaction and dimerization interface) and the virus-type replication-repair nuclease module (VRR_NUC, catalytic site) (Figure 1). DNA binding promotes dimerization of FAN1 in a "head to tail" fashion.

The SAP region contains three major components: α_{9}, α_{5}β_{1}, and α_{7}. The core helix α_{9} stabilizes the protein as it moves through dimer configurations and mediates the interactions between α_{5}β_{1} and α_{7} as they adjust their positions. These three configurations are the substrate scanning, substrate latching and substrate unwinding forms (figure 2).

In the FAN1 dimer, the SAP regions of both FAN1 enzymes make contact with the DNA duplex (dsDNA). This double contact facilitates DNA induced dimerization, as well as guiding the single stranded (ssDNA) into the SAP domain of the downstream enzyme (^{P}SAP). The SAP domain of the upstream FAN1 component enzyme (^{A}SAP) aids in guiding the DNA to ^{P}SAP.

The SAP surface facing the catalytic site is the most conserved region between FAN1 homologs. It is positively charged for favorable hydrogen bonding and electrostatic interactions with DNA. In particular, residues Y374 and Y436 form hydrogen bonds with the phosphate backbone. FAN1 can bind DNA in either direction. However, when the 5' flab is facing away from the VRR_NUC site, substrate latching and unwinding cannot occur. The unresolved portion of FAN1 contains a Zinc finger at the N terminus called a UBZ region. This is present in proteins that bind to ubiquitinated proteins, and is highly conserved across eukaryotes. This Zinc finger is crucial for recruitment to the ubiquitinated FANCD2/FANCI complex, and is found in other nucleases. The VRR_Nuc catalytic domain is located at the C terminus and contains the endonuclease functionality. FAN1 is the first known instance of a virus type replication-repair nuclease module in eukaryotes. It is normally found as a standalone domain in bacterial and viral Holliday Junction Resolvases (HJR). FAN1 does not exhibit any activity on Holliday Junction (HJ) substrates. A subdomain of SAP consisting of six α helices connected to the VRR_Nuc region is thought to inhibit HJR activity.

== Function ==
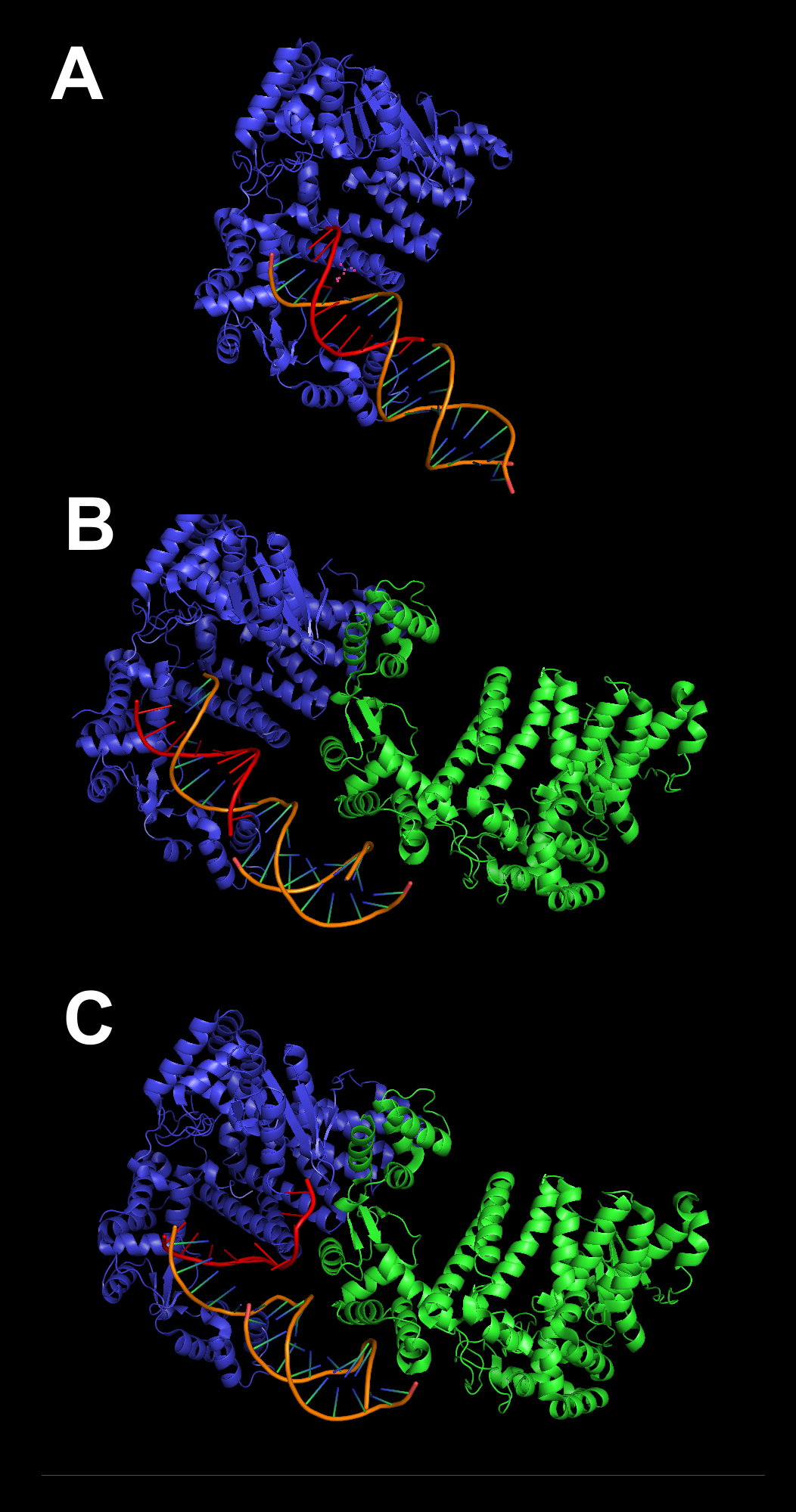
Figure 2. Three conformations of FAN1 in action. A. Monomer scans substrate B. Dimerization occurs and dimer latches onto substrate C. dimer unwinds substrate. Created in PyMOL from PDB structures 4REA, 4REC, and 4REB.

Interstrand DNA crosslinks (ICLs) effectively block the progression of transcription and replication machineries. Release of this block, referred to as unhooking, is thought to require incision of one strand of the duplex on either side of the ICL.

Repair of interstrand DNA crosslinks is triggered when the DNA replication fork is unable to continue. The FA proteins play an elaborate role with FAN1 to remove these ICLs. The pathway consists of 15 known proteins. Three of them form the FA AP24-MHF1/2 complex which recognizes the ICL (from stalled replication forks). This recruits the FA core complex, which consists of 8 proteins. This complex monoubiquitinates FANCD2 and FANCI, which allows it to form a heterodimer. It is this complex that recruits FAN1 as well as other nucleases such as SLX4. Ubiquinated FANCD2 interacts with the FAN1 nuclease. Upon its recruitment by FANCD2, FAN1 acts to restrain DNA replication fork progression and to prevent chromosome abnormalities from occurring when DNA replication forks stall. FAN1 is typically localized in the nucleus, but forms very distinct loci at damaged regions when ICLs are present.

The FAN1 protein possesses endonuclease and exonuclease functions to remove ICLs. At a replication fork arrested at an ICL, FAN1 nuclease action can catalyze incisions in the double-stranded region. It is thought that this process consists of unhooking the crosslink and separating the DNA strands through two incision events, yielding one strand with a crosslinked nucleotide and another strand with a gap. FAN1 preferentially acts as a 5’ flap endonuclease. This is illustrated in Figure 2, which shows the sequence of substrate scanning, latching, and unwinding. It usually cleaves about 5 nucleotides from a junction. FAN1 will also incise at splayed arms, three way junctions, and 3’ flaps (in order of decreasing preference). In high concentrations FAN1 has been shown to exhibit 3’ 5’ exonuclease activity. In blunt end substrates, FAN1 has also 5’ recessed ends. However, FAN1 does not appear to bind to single stranded DNA.

The presence of the FANCD2/FANCI complex is unaffected by knockdown of FAN1. This is because FAN1 acts downstream to the recruitment of FANCD2/FANCI. FAN1 has also been shown to increase the frequency of homologous recombination. This suggests that the gapped intermediate that forms following ICL unhooking may be repaired through HR when homologous chromosomes are present. FAN1 does not appear to be involved in other types of DNA repair, as it does not localize to DNA upon irradiation.

== Clinical significance ==
Mutations affecting the function of the 15 known FA genes are associated with Fanconi anemia, a recessive autosomal disorder. It is characterized by congenital abnormalities as well as anemia, bone marrow failure, and cancer predisposition in childhood. However, some patients have “unassigned” Fanconi Anemia where no mutations in the known FA genes can be found. Mutations in FAN1 can result in chronic kidney diseases and neurological conditions such as schizophrenia. However, recent research has called into question the categorization of FAN1 as an FA gene. In 2015 researchers studied four individuals with chromosomal microdeletion of 15q13.3. Analysis of blood samples revealed only mild ICL agent sensitivity and chromosomal fragility consistent with Fanconi Anemia.

A deficiency of FAN1 increases in vitro sensitivity to cisplatin and mitomycin C, two crosslinking agents FAN1 is also able to repair mitomycin C induced double strand breaks.

Germline mutations in the FAN1 gene can cause hereditary colorectal cancer due to defective DNA repair.
