= RAD1 =

RAD1 can refer to:

- Nintendo Research & Development 1
- RAD1 homolog, a human gene
