= DnaN =

DNA polymerase III subunit beta
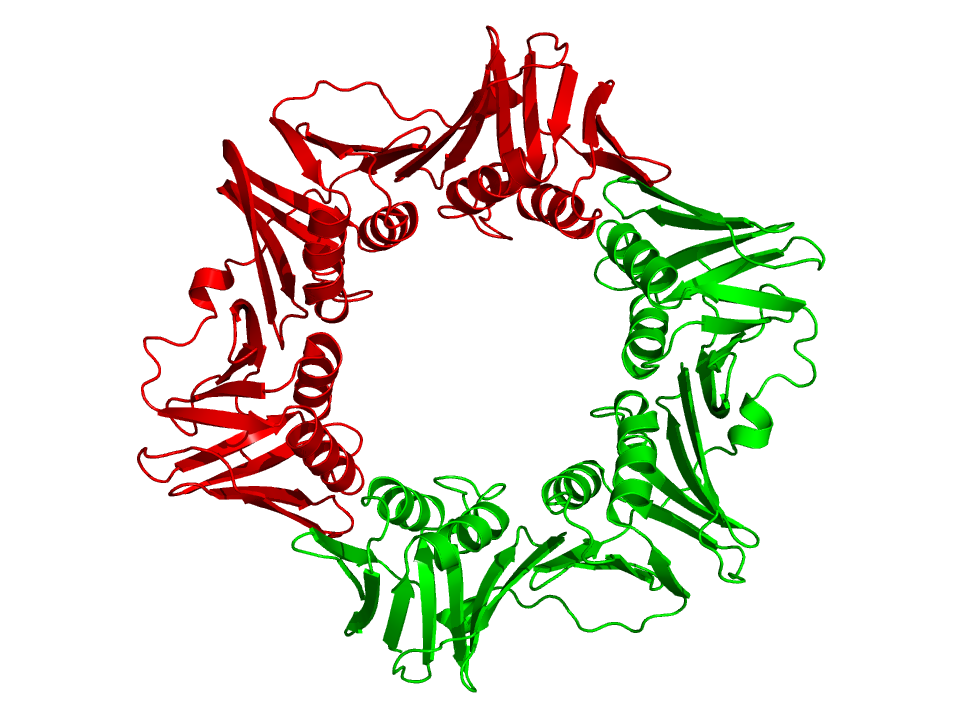
- Crystallographic structure of the dimeric DNA polymerase beta subunit from E. coli.

Identifiers
- Organism: Escherichia coli (str. K-12 substr. MG1655)
- Symbol: dnaN
- Entrez: 948218
- PDB: 1MMI
- RefSeq (Prot): NP_418156
- UniProt: P0A988

Other data
- EC number: 2.7.7.7
- Chromosome: MG1655: 3.88 - 3.88 Mb
Search for
- Structures: Swiss-model
- Domains: InterPro

dnaN is the gene that codes for the DNA clamp (also known as β sliding clamp) of DNA polymerase III in prokaryotes. The β clamp physically locks Pol III onto a DNA strand during replication to help increase its processivity. The eukaryotic equivalent to the β clamp is PCNA.

== Description ==
The β clamp plays an essential role in bacterial DNA replication. DnaN is a key gene in many research findings from molecular genetics, structural biology, mutational analysis, and evolutionary studies. The dnaN gene encodes the β subunit of DNA polymerase III, the primary enzyme responsible for chromosomal replication in E. coli. The β subunit functions as a sliding clamp, forming a ring around the DNA to secure the polymerase and allow it to move efficiently along the strand without dissociating. As a processivity factor, the β clamp holds DNA polymerase III on the DNA, allowing long stretches of DNA to be synthesized without detaching from the DNA template. It also serves as a docking site for multiple protein interactions, such as facilitating the transition between replicative and translesion synthesis polymerases, coordinating DNA repair, integrating checkpoints, and allowing the cell to keep copying DNA even when problems are detected. This function is crucial for rapid and accurate replication, ensuring the entire genome is efficiently and properly duplicated in each cell cycle. Therefore, dnaN and the β sliding clamp are crucial for proper cell division.

Located directly downstream of the dnaA gene (separated by only four base pairs), dnaN forms part of a bicistronic operon, transcribed under the control of the dnaA promoter^{.} There is no promoter between dnaA and dnaN, and the genes are transcribed as a single mRNA. Experimental data demonstrate that disruptions to this region impact both replication initiation (dnaA) and elongation (dnaN), indicating a tightly regulated and evolutionarily conserved linkage.

The translation of dnaN begins at an ATG start codon, producing a 366 amino acid protein with a molecular mass of about 40 kDa.^{[11]} This protein folds into three domains per monomer, and two monomers assemble into a ring-shaped dimer that clamps around DNA. Specific motifs near the N-terminal and domain linkers contribute to dimer formation and stability.

== Mutations and functional analysis ==
Researchers have contacted numerous different studies to identify gene mutations and how different mutations of the dnaN gene, which makes the β sliding clamp protein, affect bacterial survival.

Mutations in dnaN, such as dnaN59 and dnaN806, reveal the exact amino acids in a protein sequence that are required for clamp function. The dnaN59 mutation produces a temperature-sensitive phenotype, halting DNA replication at non-permissive temperatures. DnaN806 results in a shortened β clamp that is unable to function unless suppressed by a tRNA suppressor allele. These mutants have been pivotal in identifying essential protein domains and interactions, as they allow researchers to observe how specific changes in the β clamp structure affect its ability to interact with DNA, polymerases, and other replication or repair proteins. By analyzing the functional consequences of these mutations, scientists can map out which regions of the protein are necessary for its stability, dimerization, and binding capacity.

A study used a technique called in vivo complementation, where they tested whether a mutant version of the gene can replace the normal one in living bacteria. The study found that some mutations in the β clamp, specifically at positions D150 and P363, are critical. When these amino acids are changed, the clamp no longer works on its own, meaning the bacteria can't survive without the normal version. This shows that these spots are essential for the clamp to function. However, other mutations, like Q61K and M204K, do not stop bacteria survival, but they do affect how cells respond to stress, such as problems during DNA replication. The study also found if the normal β clamp (without mutations) is made in too large amounts, it actually becomes toxic to the bacteria and slows their growth. But when certain mutant clamps are made in high amounts instead, the bacteria don't get sick, suggesting that some of the mutated versions are less disruptive.

The dnaN and dnaE genes encode for essential subunits of DNA polymerase III. The dnaN gene produces the β subunit, while dnaE encodes the α subunit (the catalytic core that builds new DNA strands). A mutation known as sueA77 in the dnaN gene showed the ability to compensate for certain defective mutations in the dnaE gene. This mutation is trans-dominant, meaning it could exert its effect over a normal copy of dnaN was present. The sueA77 mutation allowed cells with otherwise nonfunctional dnaE alleles to replicate DNA and survive at higher temperatures. This suggests that sueA77 alters the β subunit in a way that enhances or stabilizes its interaction with the α subunit, supporting the idea that direct cooperation between these subunits is essential for effective DNA replication.

== Clamp function ==
The β clamp is loaded onto DNA by a group of helper proteins called the γ-complex. This process requires energy, and is driven by ATP to open the clamp and attach it. Structural studies show that the β clamp must first open to be loaded and then close around the DNA. This loading process is precisely regulated to occurs exactly where DNA copying begins.^{[10]} High-resolution crystallography studies have shown that DNA passes through the β clamp at a tilted angle of approximately 22°, allowing key amino acid residues like R24 and Q149 to make contact with the DNA. These interactions are essential for the clamp to close properly and recruit DNA polymerase. The αε polymerase is the actual enzyme that does the copying. On its own, it can't stay on the DNA for long, But once it connects to the β clamp, it becomes very stable and can copy DNA without falling off. Additionally, other residues form a secondary binding pocket that may temporarily hold single-stranded DNA, helping to keep the clamp in place and facilitating polymerase switching during replication stress.^{[5]} After loading, the clamp interacts with multiple polymerases and accessory proteins to ensure replication proceeds even if there are damaged DNA regions.

== DnaN inhibitors ==
Research has identified a new class of inhibitors that target dnaN, known as mycoplanecins, which offer promising avenues for tuberculosis antibiotic development. Mycoplanecins bind to dnaN with nanomolar affinity, meaning they interact very strongly and specifically with their target, effectively blocking its role in bacterial DNA replication. Among them, mycoplanecin E has shown exceptional potency, with an MIC of just 83 ng/mL, which is 24 times more effective than griselimycin. Structural studies, including co-crystallization with dnaN, have revealed how mycoplanecins engage the clamp, making them strong candidates for new anti-tuberculosis therapies. Another dnaN inhibitor known as, griselimycins, is a cyclic peptide derived from Streptomyces species. Griselimycins have been shown to bind to dnaN with high affinity, disrupting its interaction with DNA polymerase III. These compounds have already provided key structural insights into how dnaN can be inhibited and have served as a foundation for further tuberculosis antibiotic research. Beyond natural products, synthetic peptides and small molecules have also been developed to target dnaN. These include engineered peptides that mimic natural dnaN-binding motifs and small molecules identified through high-throughput screening. Some of these synthetic inhibitors have successfully blocked bacterial replication in lab models, demonstrating the broad potential of dnaN-targeting strategies for next-generation antibiotic development.
