= HolC =

DNA pol III chi subunit

Identifiers
- Organism: Escherichia coli (str. K-12 substr. MG1655)
- Symbol: holC
- Entrez: 948787
- RefSeq (Prot): NP_418680.1
- UniProt: P28905

Other data
- EC number: 2.7.7.7
- Chromosome: genome: 4.48 - 4.48 Mb
Search for
- Structures: Swiss-model
- Domains: InterPro

DNA polymerase III chi subunit, HolC
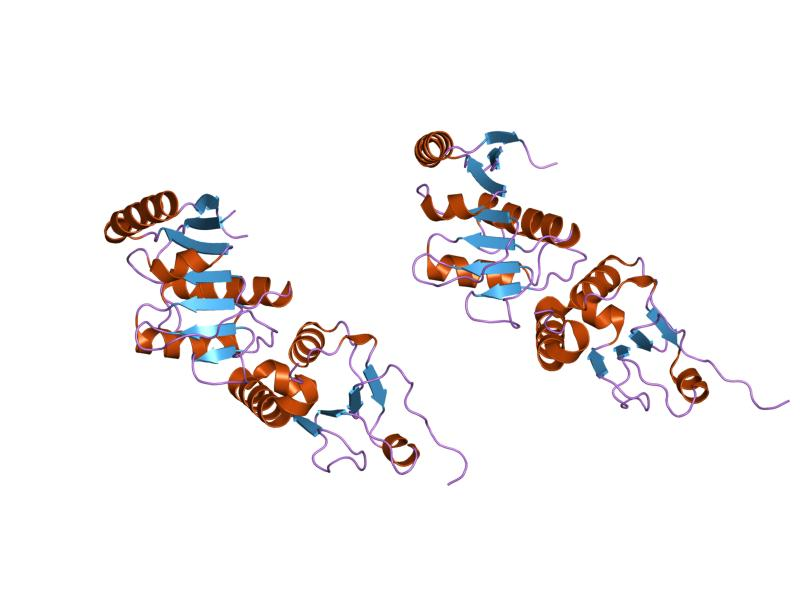
- crystal structure of chi and psi subunit heterodimer from dna pol iii

Identifiers
- Symbol: DNA_pol3_chi
- Pfam: PF04364
- InterPro: IPR007459
- SCOP2: 1em8 / SCOPe / SUPFAM
Available protein structures:
- Pfam: structures / ECOD
- PDB: RCSB PDB; PDBe; PDBj
- PDBsum: structure summary

In E. coli and other bacteria, holC is a gene that encodes the chi subunit of DNA polymerase III.
