= DNAJC7 =

Protein-coding gene in the species Homo sapiens

Identifiers
- Aliases: DNAJC7, DJ11, DJC7, TPR2, TTC2, DnaJ heat shock protein family (Hsp40) member C7
- External IDs: OMIM: 601964; MGI: 1928373; GeneCards: DNAJC7

Gene location (Human)
Chr.	Chromosome 17 (human)
Band	17q21.2	Start	41,976,421 bp
Band	17q21.2	End	42,021,376 bp

Gene location (Mouse)
Chr.	Chromosome 11 (mouse)
Band	11 D|11 63.47 cM	Start	100,473,644 bp
Band	11 D|11 63.47 cM	End	100,511,014 bp
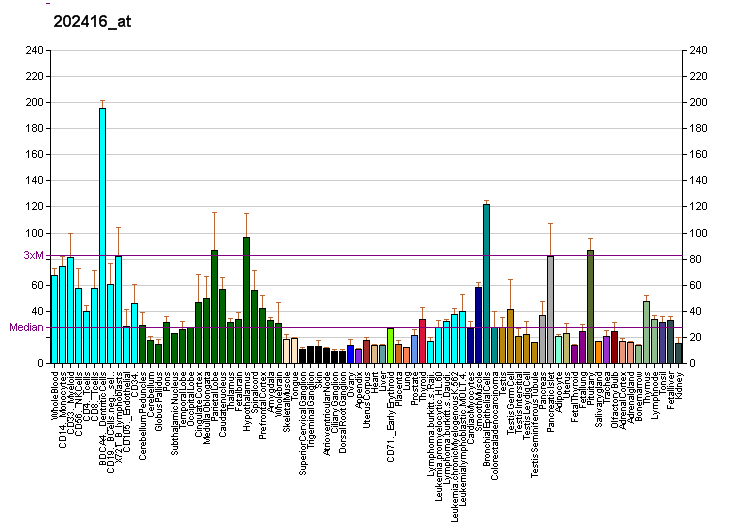
RNA expression pattern
Bgee	Human / Mouse (ortholog); Top expressed in: nucleus accumbens; caudate nucleus; right frontal lobe; anterior pituitary; monocyte; mucosa of transverse colon; apex of heart; cingulate gyrus; Brodmann area 9; anterior cingulate cortex / Top expressed in: tail of embryo; neural layer of retina; ventricular zone; genital tubercle; superior frontal gyrus; thymus; ganglionic eminence; cerebellar cortex; primary visual cortex; trigeminal ganglion; More reference expression data
BioGPS	More reference expression data
Gene ontology
Molecular function	protein binding; heat shock protein binding; ATPase activator activity
Cellular component	cytoplasm; extracellular exosome; cytoskeleton; membrane; nucleus; nucleoplasm; cytosol
Biological process	regulation of cellular response to heat; protein folding; positive regulation of ATP-dependent activity; chaperone cofactor-dependent protein refolding
Sources:Amigo / QuickGO
Orthologs
Databases	NCBI: entry; OMA: entry
Species	Human	Mouse
Entrez	7266	56354
Ensembl	ENSG00000168259	ENSMUSG00000014195
UniProt	Q99615	Q9QYI3
RefSeq (mRNA)	NM_001144766; NM_003315	NM_019795; NM_001378962; NM_001378963
RefSeq (protein)	NP_001138238; NP_003306	NP_062769; NP_001365891; NP_001365892
Location (UCSC)	Chr 17: 41.98 – 42.02 Mb	Chr 11: 100.47 – 100.51 Mb
PubMed search
- Wikidata
View/Edit Human	View/Edit Mouse

DnaJ homolog subfamily C member 7 is a protein that in humans is encoded by the DNAJC7 gene.

== Interactions ==
DNAJC7 has been shown to interact with RAD9A.
