= SLX4IP =

Protein-coding gene in the species Homo sapiens

Identifiers
- Aliases: SLX4IP, C20orf94, bA204H22.1, bA254M13.1, dJ1099D15.3, SLX4 interacting protein
- External IDs: OMIM: 615958; MGI: 1921493; HomoloGene: 49913; GeneCards: SLX4IP; OMA:SLX4IP - orthologs

Gene location (Human)
Chr.	Chromosome 20 (human)
Band	20p12.2	Start	10,435,305 bp
Band	20p12.2	End	10,636,829 bp

Gene location (Mouse)
Chr.	Chromosome 2 (mouse)
Band	2|2 F3	Start	136,733,138 bp
Band	2|2 F3	End	136,913,870 bp
RNA expression pattern
Bgee	Human / Mouse (ortholog); Top expressed in: pancreatic epithelial cell; pancreatic ductal cell; corpus epididymis; oocyte; secondary oocyte; nasal epithelium; sperm; epithelium of nasopharynx; gums; gingival epithelium / Top expressed in: zygote; secondary oocyte; hand; spermatocyte; tail of embryo; genital tubercle; Rostral migratory stream; primary oocyte; ganglionic eminence; epiblast; More reference expression data
BioGPS	n/a
Orthologs
Species	Human	Mouse
Entrez	128710	74243
Ensembl	ENSG00000149346	ENSMUSG00000027281
UniProt	Q5VYV7	Q9D7Y9
RefSeq (mRNA)	NM_001009608	NM_001038641; NM_028201; NM_028834; NM_001355669; NM_001355670 NM_001355671
RefSeq (protein)	NP_001009608	NP_001033730; NP_082477; NP_083110; NP_001342598; NP_001342599 NP_001342600
Location (UCSC)	Chr 20: 10.44 – 10.64 Mb	Chr 2: 136.73 – 136.91 Mb
PubMed search
- Wikidata
View/Edit Human	View/Edit Mouse

SLX4 interacting protein is a protein that in humans is encoded by the SLX4IP gene.

== Function ==
SLX4 interacting protein (SLX4IP) exists in a monomeric form, and interacts with the SLX4-XPF-ERCC1 multiprotein complex, which is responsible for the assembly of a Holliday junction resolvase in the role of DNA repair and maintenance.

SLX4IP has been shown to directly interact with the N-terminal end of the SLX4 protein, which plays a role in the coordination of multiple different DNA structure-specific endonucleases.

SLX4IP has also been shown to be involved in the control of alternative lengthening of telomeres, through its accumulation and interactions with the SLX4, BLM and XPF proteins.

== Location and expression ==
The SLX4IP gene is located on the short arm (p) of chromosome 20 at position 12.2 (20p12.2). The human SLX4IP gene contains 14 exons, with the cDNA being 204,000 base pairs orientated on the plus strand. This codes for a protein of 408 amino acids with a molecular mass of 45,552 daltons.

Homologs of the SLX4IP gene have been found to be conserved in several non-human species including mice, rats, frogs, chickens, dogs, rhesus monkeys and chimpanzees. Orthologs for the human SLX4IP gene have also been identified in 283 other organisms.

The SLX4IP protein is expressed at its highest level in the skin and the testis, along with being expressed in 26 other tissues.

== Clinical significance ==
=== Cancer ===
==== Acute lymphoblastic leukemia ====
Somatic and monoallelic deletions of the 5’ region of SLX4IP was shown to occur in 30% of patients with childhood acute lymphoblastic leukemia (ALL) and in cases of ETV6/RUNX1-rearranged acute lymphoblastic leukemia, deletions were found in greater than 60% of cases. By analyzing the breakpoints of SLX4IP, characteristic illegitimate V(D)J mediated recombination was revealed. These deletions were found to be significantly biased towards the male gender.

==== Alternative lengthening of telomeres ====
In order for cancer cells to retain their ability to proliferate without limitations, they can regulate the telomeres of their chromosomes by recombination via a process known as alternative lengthening of telomeres (ALT). This recombination has been shown to require the accumulation of SLX4IP at ALT telomeres due to its antagonization of promiscuous BLM activity. BLM is responsible for the extension of telomeres as it is a RecQ helicase vital to homologous recombination and DNA replication.

=== Interstrand crosslink repair ===
In DNA, Interstrand crosslinks (ICLs) are required to be repaired due to their high toxicity, often leading to diseases such as Fanconi anaemia. SLX4IP plays a role in the ICL repair functionality of the SLX4-XPF-ERCC1 complex, due to its simultaneous binding of both SLX4 and XPF-ERCC1, which maintains the stability of the complex and promotes interaction between the SLX4 and the XPF-ERCC1 regions. When SLX4IP was depleted from treated cells, they were found to accumulate in the G2/M phase of the cell cycle where the resolution of holiday junctions during ICL repair regularly occurs.

=== HIV-1 ===
The HIV-1 auxiliary protein Vpr potently stops the host cells progression through its natural cycle at the G2/M transition stage. This arrest was found to be caused from its premature activation of the SLX4 structure-specific endonuclease complex, which SLX4IP directly interacts with. Through this research the SLX4 complex was also discovered to be involved with the regulation of innate immunity, due to its negative regulation of type 1 interferon production, both when induced spontaneously and HIV-1-mediated.
