= DNA polymerase III, delta subunit =

Identifiers
- Organism: Escherichia coli (str. K-12 substr. MG1655)
- Symbol: holA
- Entrez: 947573
- Orthologs: NCBI: entry; OMA: entry
- RefSeq (Prot): NP_415173.1
- UniProt: P28630

Other data
- EC number: 2.7.7.7
- Chromosome: genome: 0.67 - 0.67 Mb
Search for
- Structures: Swiss-model
- Domains: InterPro

DNA polymerase III, delta subunit
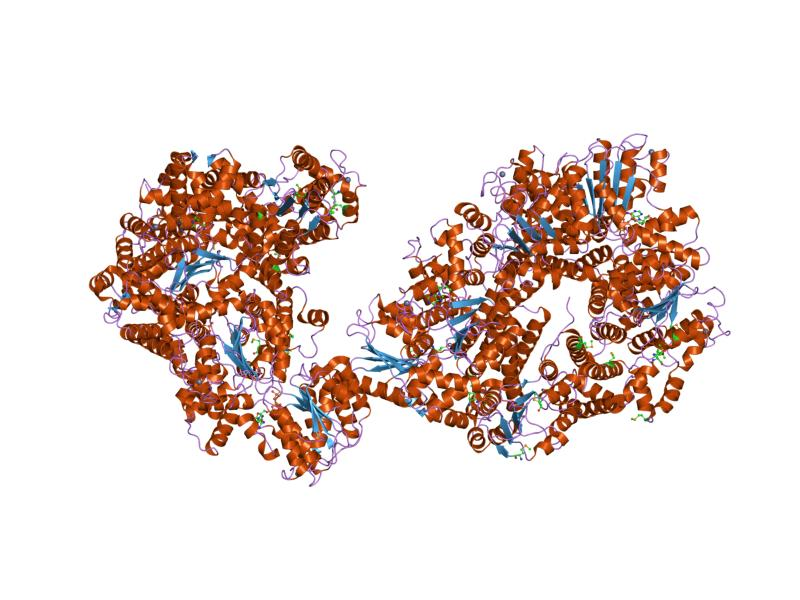
- atpgs bound e. coli clamp loader complex

Identifiers
- Symbol: DNA_pol3_delta
- Pfam: PF06144
- Pfam clan: CL0023
- InterPro: IPR010372
- SCOP2: 1jql / SCOPe / SUPFAM
Available protein structures:
- PDB: IPR010372 PF06144 (ECOD; PDBsum)
- AlphaFold: IPR010372; PF06144

In molecular biology, the δ (delta) subunit of DNA polymerase III is encoded by the holA gene in E. coli and other bacteria. Along with the γ, δ', χ, and ψ subunits that make up the core polymerase, and the β accessory proteins, the δ subunit is responsible for the high speed and processivity of polIII.
