= RAD17 =

Protein-coding gene in the species Homo sapiens

Available structures
PDB	Ortholog search: PDBe RCSB
PDB	List of PDB id codes 3A1J, 3G65, 3GGR

Identifiers
- Aliases: RAD17, CCYC, HR24L, RAD17SP, RAD24, RAD17 checkpoint clamp loader component
- External IDs: OMIM: 603139; MGI: 1333807; HomoloGene: 32117; GeneCards: RAD17; OMA:RAD17 - orthologs

Gene location (Human)
Chr.	Chromosome 5 (human)
Band	5q13.2	Start	69,369,293 bp
Band	5q13.2	End	69,414,801 bp

Gene location (Mouse)
Chr.	Chromosome 13 (mouse)
Band	13|13 D1	Start	100,753,672 bp
Band	13|13 D1	End	100,787,559 bp
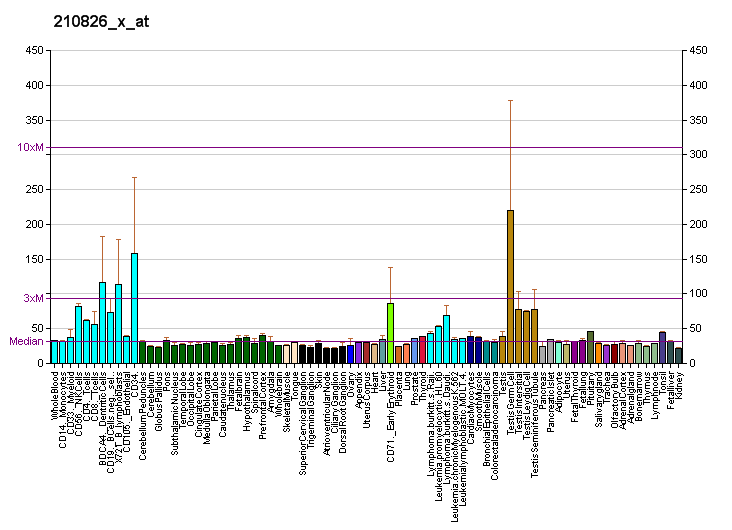

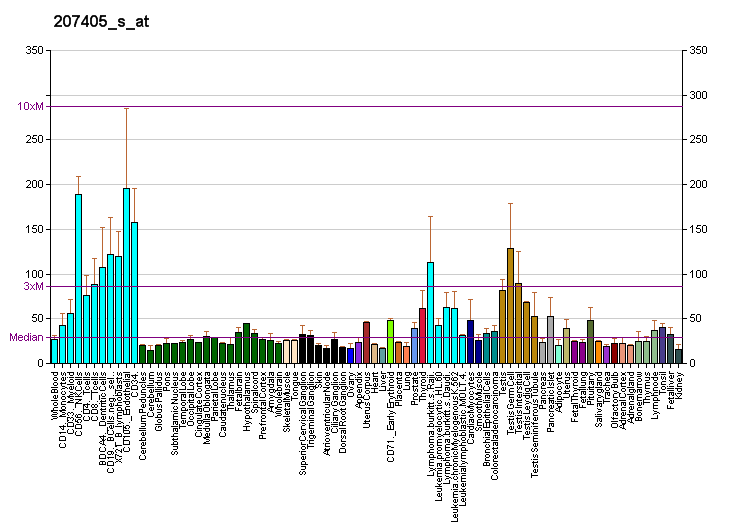

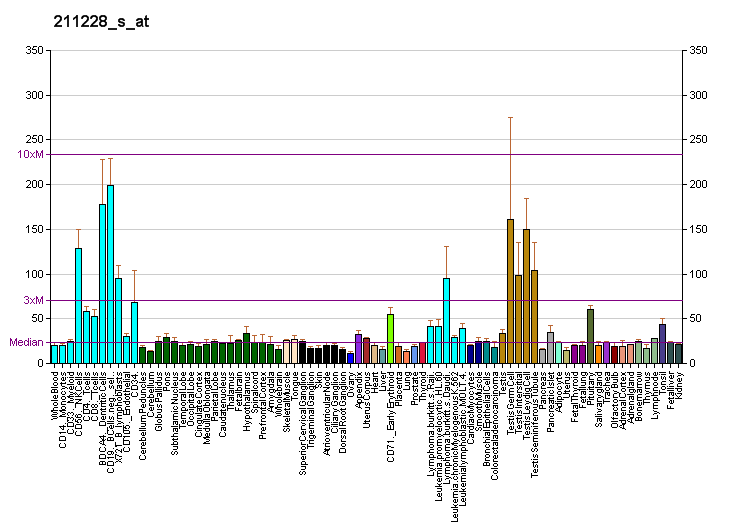
RNA expression pattern
Bgee	Human / Mouse (ortholog); Top expressed in: gonad; testicle; right testis; left testis; islet of Langerhans; epithelium of colon; endometrium; tonsil; Achilles tendon; ganglionic eminence / Top expressed in: Gonadal ridge; spermatid; mandibular prominence; atrioventricular valve; seminiferous tubule; maxillary prominence; olfactory epithelium; vas deferens; atrium; abdominal wall; More reference expression data
BioGPS	More reference expression data
Gene ontology
Molecular function	nucleotide binding; protein binding; ATP binding; chromatin binding; DNA clamp loader activity
Cellular component	telomere; Rad17 RFC-like complex; nucleus; nucleoplasm; nucleolus
Biological process	mitotic cell cycle checkpoint signaling; DNA replication checkpoint signaling; DNA replication; DNA damage checkpoint signaling; cell cycle; regulation of phosphorylation; negative regulation of DNA replication; cellular response to DNA damage stimulus; mitotic DNA replication checkpoint signaling; DNA repair; regulation of signal transduction by p53 class mediator
Sources:Amigo / QuickGO
Orthologs
Species	Human	Mouse
Entrez	5884	19356
Ensembl	ENSG00000276618; ENSG00000152942	ENSMUSG00000021635
UniProt	O75943	Q6NXW6
RefSeq (mRNA)	NM_001278622; NM_002873; NM_133338; NM_133339; NM_133340 NM_133341; NM_133342; NM_133343; NM_133344	NM_001044371; NM_001283011; NM_011233
RefSeq (protein)	NP_001265551; NP_002864; NP_579916; NP_579917; NP_579918 NP_579919; NP_579920; NP_579921; NP_579922	NP_001037836; NP_001269940; NP_035363
Location (UCSC)	Chr 5: 69.37 – 69.41 Mb	Chr 13: 100.75 – 100.79 Mb
PubMed search
- Wikidata
View/Edit Human	View/Edit Mouse

Cell cycle checkpoint protein RAD17 is a protein that in humans is encoded by the RAD17 gene.

== Function ==
The protein encoded by this gene is highly similar to the gene product of Schizosaccharomyces pombe rad17, a cell cycle checkpoint gene required for cell cycle arrest and DNA damage repair in response to DNA damage. This protein shares strong similarity with DNA replication factor C (RFC) and can form a complex with RFCs. This protein binds to chromatin prior to DNA damage and is phosphorylated by ATR after the damage. This protein recruits the RAD1-RAD9-HUS1 checkpoint protein complex onto chromatin after DNA damage, which may be required for its phosphorylation. The phosphorylation of this protein is required for the DNA-damage-induced cell cycle G2 arrest. It is also thought to be a critical early event during checkpoint signaling in DNA-damaged cells. Eight alternatively spliced transcript variants of this gene, which encode four distinct proteins, have been reported.

=== Meiosis ===
During meiosis in yeast and in mammals, RAD17 protein functions as a DNA damage sensor promoting DNA checkpoint control. In yeast, the RAD17 protein facilitates proper assembly of the meiotic crossover recombination complex containing the RAD51 protein, thus promoting efficient repair of meiotic DNA double-strand breaks. During male meiosis in maize (Zea mays), the ZmRAD17 gene is involved in repair of DNA double strand breaks, likely by promoting synaptonemal complex assembly.

== Interactions ==
RAD17 has been shown to interact with:

- Ataxia telangiectasia and Rad3 related,
- Ataxia telangiectasia mutated,
- HUS1,
- NHP2L1,
- POLE,
- RAD1 homolog, and
- RAD9A.
