= SLX4 =

Protein involved in DNA repair

Identifiers
- Aliases: SLX4, BTBD12, FANCP, MUS312, SLX4 structure-specific endonuclease subunit
- External IDs: OMIM: 613278; MGI: 106299; GeneCards: SLX4
Available structures
PDB	Ortholog search: PDBe RCSB
PDB	List of PDB id codes 4M7C, 4UYI, 4ZOU

Gene location (Human)
Chr.	Chromosome 16 (human)
Band	16p13.3	Start	3,581,181 bp
Band	16p13.3	End	3,611,606 bp

Gene location (Mouse)
Chr.	Chromosome 16 (mouse)
Band	16 A1|16 2.34 cM	Start	3,979,105 bp
Band	16 A1|16 2.34 cM	End	4,003,770 bp
RNA expression pattern
Bgee	Human / Mouse (ortholog); Top expressed in: right hemisphere of cerebellum; pancreatic ductal cell; gonad; granulocyte; testicle; right testis; left testis; stromal cell of endometrium; ventricular zone; tibialis anterior muscle / Top expressed in: zygote; spermatocyte; genital tubercle; tail of embryo; spermatid; gastrula; neural layer of retina; secondary oocyte; seminiferous tubule; ventricular zone; More reference expression data
BioGPS	n/a
Gene ontology
Molecular function	protein binding; enzyme activator activity; endodeoxyribonuclease activity; crossover junction endodeoxyribonuclease activity; 5'-flap endonuclease activity; 3'-flap endonuclease activity
Cellular component	ERCC4-ERCC1 complex; nucleoplasm; cell junction; Holliday junction resolvase complex; nucleus; telomere; cytosol; Slx1-Slx4 complex
Biological process	nucleotide-excision repair; DNA recombination; positive regulation of t-circle formation; cellular response to DNA damage stimulus; DNA double-strand break processing involved in repair via single-strand annealing; DNA replication; response to intra-S DNA damage checkpoint signaling; positive regulation of catalytic activity; DNA repair; interstrand cross-link repair; resolution of meiotic recombination intermediates; double-strand break repair via homologous recombination; meiotic DNA double-strand break processing; telomeric D-loop disassembly; t-circle formation; negative regulation of telomere maintenance via telomere lengthening
Sources:Amigo / QuickGO
Orthologs
Databases	NCBI: entry; OMA: entry
Species	Human	Mouse
Entrez	84464	52864
Ensembl	ENSG00000188827	ENSMUSG00000039738
UniProt	Q8IY92	Q6P1D7
RefSeq (mRNA)	NM_032444	NM_177472
RefSeq (protein)	NP_115820	NP_803423; NP_001389852; NP_001389853; NP_001389854; NP_001389855 NP_001389856; NP_001389857; NP_001389859; NP_001389860
Location (UCSC)	Chr 16: 3.58 – 3.61 Mb	Chr 16: 3.98 – 4 Mb
PubMed search
- Wikidata
View/Edit Human	View/Edit Mouse

SLX4 (also known as BTBD12 and FANCP) is a protein involved in DNA repair, where it has important roles in the final steps of homologous recombination. Mutations in the gene are associated with the disease Fanconi anemia.

The version of SLX4 present in humans and other mammals acts as a sort of scaffold upon which other proteins form several different multiprotein complexes. The SLX1-SLX4 complex acts as a Holliday junction resolvase. As such, the complex cleaves the links between two homologous chromosomes that form during homologous recombination. This allows the two linked chromosomes to resolve into two unconnected double-strand DNA molecules. SLX4 is also recruited to telomeres through interaction with the shelterin protein TRF2, where it helps prevent telomeric DNA damage and contributes to telomere homeostasis. The SLX4 interacting protein interacts with SLX4 in the DNA repair process, specifically in interstrand crosslink repair. SLX4 also associates with RAD1, RAD10 and SAW1 in the single-strand annealing pathway of homologous recombination. The DNA repair function of SLX4 is involved in sensitivity to proton beam radiation.
