= HolD =

DNA pol III psi subunit

Identifiers
- Organism: Escherichia coli (str. K-12 substr. MG1655)
- Symbol: holD
- Entrez: 948890
- RefSeq (Prot): NP_418789.1
- UniProt: P28632

Other data
- EC number: 2.7.7.7
- Chromosome: genome: 4.61 - 4.61 Mb
Search for
- Structures: Swiss-model
- Domains: InterPro

In E. coli and other bacteria, holD is a gene that encodes the psi subunit of DNA polymerase III.
