= DnaE =

DNA pol III alpha subunit aka DNA Enus

Identifiers
- Organism: Escherichia coli (str. K-12 substr. MG1655)
- Symbol: dnaE
- Entrez: 944877
- PDB: 2HNH
- RefSeq (Prot): NP_414726.1
- UniProt: P10443

Other data
- EC number: 2.7.7.7
- Chromosome: genome: 0.2 - 0.21 Mb
Search for
- Structures: Swiss-model
- Domains: InterPro

Bacterial DNA polymerase III alpha subunit

Identifiers
- Symbol: DNA_pol3_alpha
- Pfam: PF07733
- InterPro: IPR011708
Available protein structures:
- Pfam: structures / ECOD
- PDB: RCSB PDB; PDBe; PDBj
- PDBsum: structure summary

DnaE, the gene product of dnaE, is the catalytic α subunit of DNA polymerase III, acting as a DNA polymerase. This enzyme is only found in prokaryotes.
