= HolB =

Protein family

DNA pol III delta prime subunit

Identifiers
- Organism: Escherichia coli (str. K-12 substr. MG1655)
- Symbol: holB
- Entrez: 945661
- RefSeq (Prot): NP_415617.1
- UniProt: P28631

Other data
- EC number: 2.7.7.7
- Chromosome: genome: 1.15 - 1.16 Mb
Search for
- Structures: Swiss-model
- Domains: InterPro

In E. coli and other bacteria, holB is a gene that encodes the delta prime subunit of DNA polymerase III.
