= NHP2L1 =

Protein found in humans

SNU13
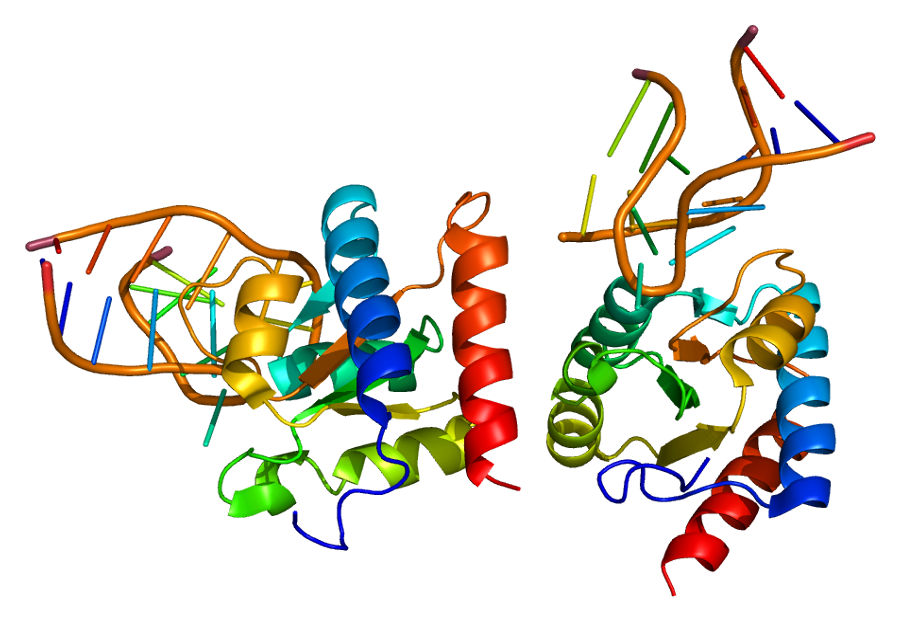

Identifiers
- Aliases: SNU13, 15.5K, FA-1, FA1, NHPX, OTK27, SNRNP15-5, SPAG12, SSFA1, NHP2L1, SNU13 homolog, small nuclear ribonucleoprotein (U4/U6.U5), small nuclear ribonucleoprotein 13
- External IDs: OMIM: 601304; MGI: 893586; GeneCards: SNU13
Available structures
| PDB | Ortholog search: PDBe RCSB |
| PDB | List of PDB id codes 1E7K, 2JNB, 2OZB, 3SIU, 3SIV, 3JCR |

Gene location (Human)
| Chr. | Chromosome 22 (human) |
| Band | 22q13.2 | Start | 41,673,933 bp |
| Band | 22q13.2 | End | 41,690,504 bp |
RNA expression pattern
| Bgee | Human / Mouse (ortholog); Top expressed in: beta cell; prefrontal cortex; hypothalamus; right frontal lobe; muscle of thigh; right ventricle; stromal cell of endometrium; left testis; right auricle of heart; Brodmann area 9 / n/a; More reference expression data |
| BioGPS | n/a |
Gene ontology
| Molecular function | U3 snoRNA binding; ATPase binding; U4 snRNA binding; U4atac snRNA binding; protein binding; snoRNA binding; RNA binding; box C/D RNA binding |
| Cellular component | nucleoplasm; spliceosomal complex; nucleus; small-subunit processome; U4/U6 x U5 tri-snRNP complex; nucleolus; dense fibrillar component; cytosolic large ribosomal subunit; precatalytic spliceosome; box C/D RNP complex; U4atac snRNP; protein-containing complex; U2-type precatalytic spliceosome; ribonucleoprotein complex |
| Biological process | mRNA processing; ribosome biogenesis; mRNA splicing, via spliceosome; RNA splicing; maturation of LSU-rRNA; maturation of SSU-rRNA; protein biosynthesis; rRNA processing; single fertilization; box C/D snoRNP assembly |
Sources:Amigo / QuickGO
Orthologs
| Databases | NCBI: entry; OMA: entry |
| Species | Human | Mouse |
| Entrez | 4809 | 20826 |
| Ensembl | ENSG00000100138 | ENSMUSG00000063480 |
| UniProt | P55769 | Q9D0T1 |
| RefSeq (mRNA) | NM_001003796; NM_005008 | NM_011482 |
| RefSeq (protein) | NP_001003796; NP_004999 | NP_035612 |
| Location (UCSC) | Chr 22: 41.67 – 41.69 Mb | n/a |
| PubMed search |
- Wikidata
| View/Edit Human | View/Edit Mouse |

NHP2-like protein 1 (or NHP2L1) is a protein that in humans is encoded by the SNU13 gene.

== Function ==
Originally named because of its sequence similarity to the Saccharomyces cerevisiae NHP2 (non-histone protein 2), this protein appears to be a highly conserved nuclear protein that is a component of the [U4/U6.U5] tri-snRNP. It binds to the 5' stem-loop of U4 snRNA. Two transcript variants encoding the same protein have been found for this gene.

== Interactions ==
SNU13 has been shown to interact with RAD17.
