= HolE =

DNA pol III theta subunit

Identifiers
- Organism: Escherichia coli (str. K-12 substr. MG1655)
- Symbol: holE
- Entrez: 947471
- RefSeq (Prot): NP_416356.1
- UniProt: P0ABS8

Other data
- EC number: 2.7.7.7
- Chromosome: genome: 1.92 - 1.92 Mb
Search for
- Structures: Swiss-model
- Domains: InterPro

DNA polymerase III, theta subunit
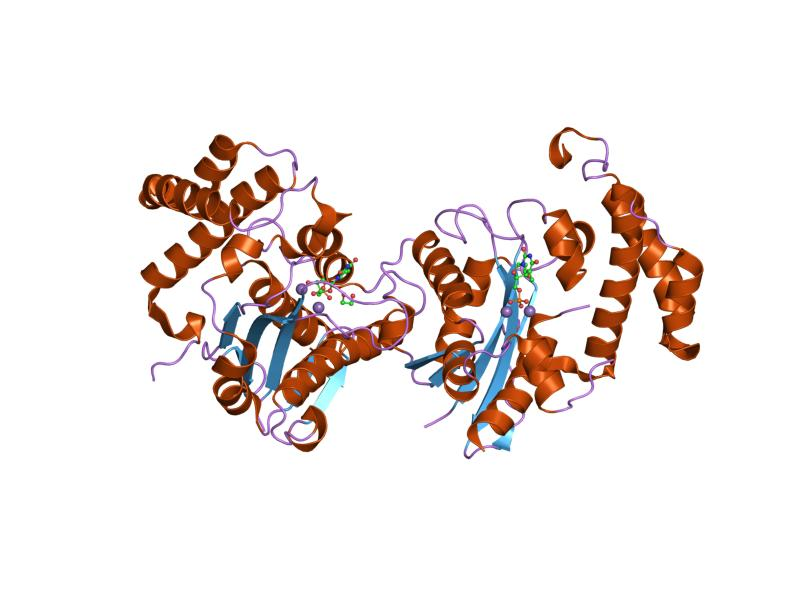
- Structure of the E. coli Pol III epsilon-Hot proofreading complex

Identifiers
- Symbol: DNA_pol3_theta
- Pfam: PF06440
- InterPro: IPR009052
- SCOP2: 1du2 / SCOPe / SUPFAM
Available protein structures:
- Pfam: structures / ECOD
- PDB: RCSB PDB; PDBe; PDBj
- PDBsum: structure summary

In E. coli and other bacteria, holE is a gene that encodes the theta subunit of DNA polymerase III.
