= DnaQ =

DNA pol III epsilon subunit
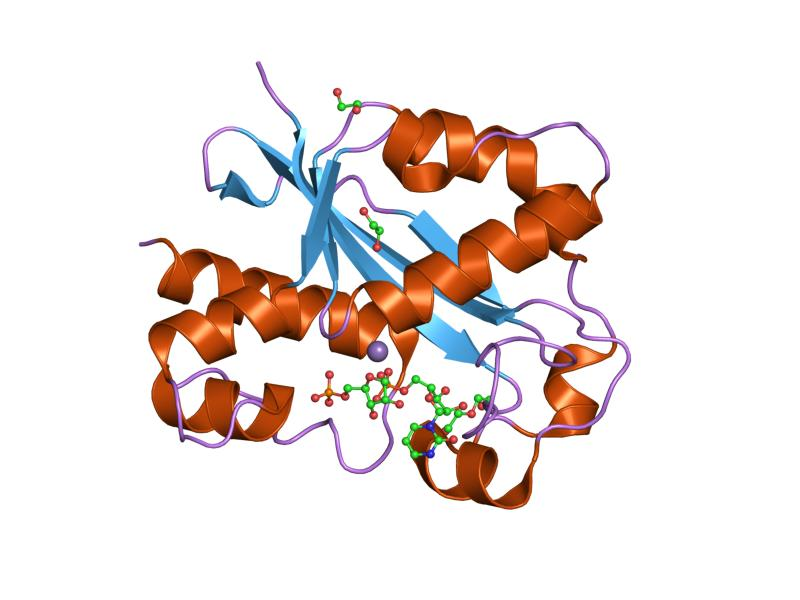
- PDB: 2GUI

Identifiers
- Organism: Escherichia coli (str. K-12 substr. MG1655)
- Symbol: dnaQ
- Entrez: 946441
- RefSeq (Prot): NP_414751.1
- UniProt: P03007

Other data
- EC number: 2.7.7.7
- Chromosome: genome: 0.24 - 0.24 Mb
Search for
- Structures: Swiss-model
- Domains: InterPro

dnaQ is the gene encoding the ε subunit of DNA polymerase III in Escherichia coli. The ε subunit is one of three core proteins in the DNA polymerase complex. It functions as a 3’→5’ DNA directed proofreading exonuclease that removes incorrectly incorporated bases during replication. dnaQ may also be referred to as mutD.

== Biological role ==
Missense mutations in the dnaQ gene lead to the induction of the SOS DNA repair mechanism. Mutating the essential amino acid in the catalytic center of the ε subunit leads to complete loss of function.

Overexpression of the ε subunit decreases the incidence of mutations with exposure to UV, proving that the epsilon subunit has an essential function in DNA editing and preventing the initiation of SOS DNA repair.

The ε subunit has also been proven to have some impact on the growth rate of E. coli. Silencing of the dnaQ gene is correlated to significantly reduced growth.

== Interactions ==
The ε subunit is stabilized by the θ subunit within the complete polymerase complex.

The gene encodes two functional domains: the N-terminus of the gene product binds the θ subunit and carries out the exonuclease function and the C-terminus binds the α subunit responsible for polymerase activity.

A Q-linker peptide of 22 residues has been identified that links the α subunit to the ε subunit, conferring flexibility that sets the α:ε complex apart from other more restricted multi-domain proofreading polymerases.

There is interaction between the missense suppressor glycine tRNA encoded by the mutA gene that is correlated to significantly increased mutation rate in cells that express the gene. The uncharged MutA tRNA possesses complementarity to a region in the 5' end of the dnaQ mRNA. This allows it to act as an antisense mRNA that directs the degradation of the dnaQ transcript and thus, a lower abundance of the subunit and increased frequency of mutation. More recently, it was suggested that the tRNA directs replacement of essential glutamate residues with glycine, leading to aberrant ε subunits and resulting in an increase in mutations. Studies with T4 bacteriophage and E. coli with defective dnaQ genes give evidence that the mutA tRNA may not have any effect on the transcription of the dnaQ gene but may affect the translation of the gene product.

== Related sequences ==
Sequences have been found in other organisms that encode gene products with a similar function to dnaQ:

In Mycobaterium tuberculosis, the gene dnaE1 encodes a polymerase and histidinol-phosphatase (PHP) domain that carries out the 3’→5’ exonuclease and proofreading function.

TREX1, the major 3'→5' exonuclease in humans, was initially called DNase III because it showed sequence homology with dnaQ in E. coli and with eukaryotic DNA polymerase epsilon and to possess biochemical characteristics that associate with the capability of DNA proofreading. It is responsible for metabolizing both single stranded DNA (ssDNA) and double stranded DNA (dsDNA) with mismatched 3' ends and is directed by endogenous retroelements.

== Evolution of dnaQ ==
During DNA replication in bacteria two key functions are expressed. The first is a DNA polymerizing function of DNA polymerase, and the second is a 3’ to 5’ exonuclease editing function. Both of these functions may be encoded within one gene, or alternatively the two functions may be encoded by separate genes. Two bacterial species that had diverged early in the course of evolution showing each of the alternative patterns were studied. In the Gram-negative bacteria Salmonella typhimurium the 3’ to 5’ editing function employed during DNA replication is encoded by gene dnaQ which specifies a 3’ to 5’ exonuclease subunit, one of the three separately encoded core proteins of the DNA polymerase III holoenzyme. The complete nucleotide sequence of dnaQ of S. typhimurium was determined. The DNA polymerase from the early diverging bacterial species, Buchnera aphidicola, was also sequenced. In this case, the DNA polymerase encoded by the DNA III (polC) gene contains both DNA polymerase and 3’ to 5’ exonuclease domains. This arrangement is in contrast to S. typhimurium in which these domains are encoded in separate genes. Based on the sequence homologies found between the DNA regions encoding the 3’ to 5’ editing functions in these bacteria, it was proposed that a last common ancestor of S. typhimurium and B. aphidicola had a single gene containing both 3’ to 5’ exonuclease and DNA polymerase domains. The evolutionary divergence of these bacteria (about 0.25 to 1.2 billion years ago), appears to have been associated with the separation of the DNA polymerase gene function from the 3’ to 5’ exonuclease editing gene function in the lineage containing S. typhimurium.
