= RAD9A =

Protein-coding gene in the species Homo sapiens

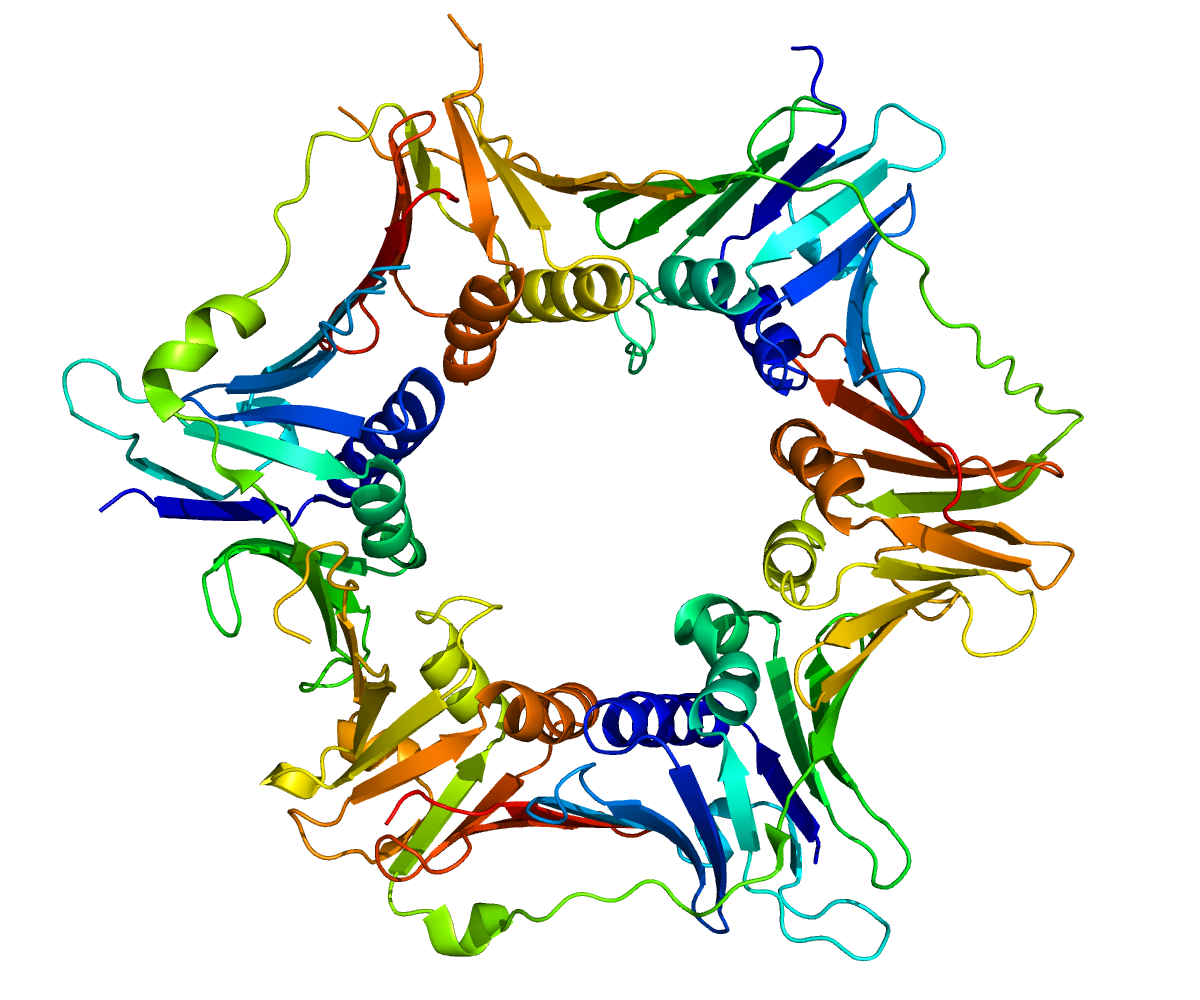
Available structures
PDB	Ortholog search: PDBe RCSB
PDB	List of PDB id codes 3A1J, 3G65, 3GGR

Identifiers
- Aliases: RAD9A, RAD9, RAD9 checkpoint clamp component A
- External IDs: OMIM: 603761; MGI: 1328356; HomoloGene: 32118; GeneCards: RAD9A; OMA:RAD9A - orthologs

Gene location (Human)
Chr.	Chromosome 11 (human)
Band	11q13.2	Start	67,317,871 bp
Band	11q13.2	End	67,398,410 bp

Gene location (Mouse)
Chr.	Chromosome 19 (mouse)
Band	19|19 A	Start	4,245,195 bp
Band	19|19 A	End	4,251,661 bp
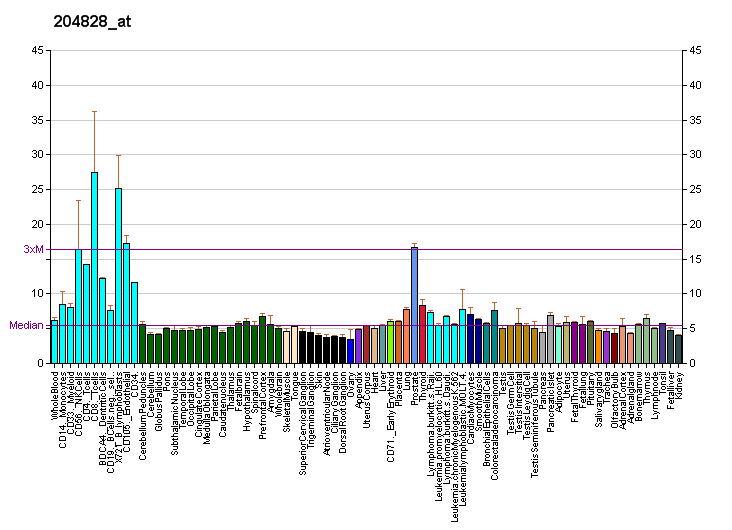
RNA expression pattern
Bgee	Human / Mouse (ortholog); Top expressed in: right uterine tube; olfactory zone of nasal mucosa; granulocyte; mucosa of transverse colon; right lobe of thyroid gland; anterior pituitary; left lobe of thyroid gland; minor salivary glands; skin of leg; canal of the cervix / Top expressed in: genital tubercle; tail of embryo; granulocyte; bone marrow; epiblast; spleen; thymus; embryo; embryo; blastocyst; More reference expression data
BioGPS	More reference expression data
Gene ontology
Molecular function	SH3 domain binding; histone deacetylase binding; exodeoxyribonuclease III activity; protein binding; 3'-5' exonuclease activity; enzyme binding; nuclease activity; exonuclease activity; hydrolase activity; protein kinase binding
Cellular component	cytoplasm; nucleoplasm; checkpoint clamp complex; nucleus
Biological process	cell cycle checkpoint signaling; mitotic intra-S DNA damage checkpoint signaling; DNA damage checkpoint signaling; cellular response to DNA damage stimulus; DNA replication checkpoint signaling; positive regulation of intrinsic apoptotic signaling pathway in response to DNA damage; cellular response to ionizing radiation; nucleic acid phosphodiester bond hydrolysis; DNA repair; DNA replication; regulation of signal transduction by p53 class mediator
Sources:Amigo / QuickGO
Orthologs
Species	Human	Mouse
Entrez	5883	19367
Ensembl	ENSG00000172613	ENSMUSG00000024824
UniProt	Q99638	Q9Z0F6
RefSeq (mRNA)	NM_001243224; NM_004584	NM_011237
RefSeq (protein)	NP_001230153; NP_004575	NP_035367
Location (UCSC)	Chr 11: 67.32 – 67.4 Mb	Chr 19: 4.25 – 4.25 Mb
PubMed search
- Wikidata
View/Edit Human	View/Edit Mouse

Cell cycle checkpoint control protein RAD9A is a protein that in humans is encoded by the RAD9A gene. Rad9 has been shown to induce G2 arrest in the cell cycle in response to DNA damage in yeast cells. Rad9 was originally found in budding yeast cells but a human homolog has also been found and studies have suggested that the molecular mechanisms of the S and G2 checkpoints are conserved in eukaryotes. Thus, what is found in yeast cells are likely to be similar in human cells.

== Function ==
This gene product is highly similar to S. pombe rad9, a cell cycle checkpoint protein required for cell cycle arrest and DNA damage repair in response to DNA damage. This protein is found to possess 3' to 5' exonuclease activity, which may contribute to its role in sensing and repairing DNA damage. It forms a checkpoint protein complex with Rad1 and Hus1. This is also known as the Rad9-Rad1-Hus1 or 9-1-1 complex. This complex is recruited by checkpoint protein Rad17 to the sites of DNA damage, which is thought to be important for triggering the checkpoint-signaling cascade. Use of alternative polyA sites has been noted for this gene. This complex plays a role in DNA base excision repair. Hus1 binds and stimulates MYH DNA glycosylase which stimulates base excision repair. Rad9 binds with the strongest affinity to DNA which attaches the complex to damaged DNA. Rad1 recruits other base excision factors. Previous research has suggested that Rad9 is not necessary to repair DNA, but it does not mean it can still play a role in DNA damage repair. If Rad9 is mutated there may be other pathways or mechanisms in DNA repair that can compensate for a loss of function.

=== Role in cell cycle ===
DNA damage can occur as a result of a wide range of environmental and internal stressors, reactive oxygen species, radiation, and exposure to carcinogens, to name a few. In these events, specialized protein kinases ATR and ATM recognize damaged DNA and recruit various proteins to the impaired sites. As a result, ATR and ATM recruit various proteins to the damage site to stop the progression of the cell cycle before division. First, the 9-1-1 complex is recruited and activated by ATR through phosphorylation and forms rings at the damage site. The 9-1-1 complex requires Rad17-RFC, which is independently recruited to the damage site as a cofactor, in order to bind to DNA. Next, Rad-9 is recruited to the site, this time without Rad-1 and Hus-1, and is phosphorylated by ATR again. This activation induces the formation of Rad-9 oligomers around the damaged chromosomes, which serve as a recruiter for CHK-2. Upon arrival at the damage site, CHK-2 is phosphorylated by ATR and released from the damage site to bind to its targets that inhibit the cell cycle progression. This way, Rad9 serves as an adaptor protein that fosters the interactions between key proteins that serve in the cell cycle control system to ensure the integrity of DNA before mitosis phase occurs.

=== Role/interactions in DNA repair ===
Cells have a number of DNA repair mechanisms that are frequently active as a result of various exposures to radiation, carcinogens, and reactive oxygen species in the body. In such events, oxidative base lesions of DNA nucleotides are common. Rad-9 has been implicated with most DNA repair mechanisms, and plays a key role as it interacts with multiple proteins within each pathway. For instance, Rad-9 acts as an activator for many vital proteins that are responsible for the base excision repair process. First, Rad-9 interacts with many DNA glycosylases that are responsible for repairing specific nucleotide lesions, e.g. Human NEIL1 DNA glycosylase, thymine DNA glycosylase, 8-oxoguanine DNA glycosylase (OGG1). Furthermore, Rad-9, either as a free floating protein or part of the 9-1-1 complex, interacts with the rest of the proteins that are part of the base excision repair process, guiding its progression through the various stages. It has known interactions with apurinic/apyrimidinic endonuclease 1 (APE1), polymerase β (Polβ), Flap endonuclease 1 (FEN1), and DNA ligase I. During DNA replication, a number of point mutations can occur, where nucleotides are deleted, inserted, or mismatched, all of which must be repaired before mitosis occurs. Rad-9 has been implicated to have a number of key interactions with mismatch repair protein complexes MLH1, MSH2, MSH3, and MSH6. Also, it has known interaction in the following repair mechanisms: nucleotide excision repair (NER), DNA interstrand cross-links resistance, and homologous recombination (HR)

=== Role in apoptosis ===
Normally, cells possess many checkpoints and repair mechanisms to fix the DNA and regain proper function before mitosis. However, when DNA damage is too extensive for the repair mechanism, cells can activate apoptosis to trigger cellular death. During such an event, Rad9 is overexpressed and translocated into the mitochondria. The BH3 motif, located in the N-terminal of the protein, inhibits Bcl-2 and Bcl-xL proteins that produce the anti-apoptotic activity in the mitochondria, thereby promoting cell death. During stressful conditions that damage DNA, tyrosine kinase C-Abl activates the BH3 motif by phosphorylating Y38, the tyrosine located in the BH3 motif, which promotes rad-9 Bcl-xL binding that induces apoptosis.

=== Role in tumorigenesis ===
The somatic mutations that an organism accumulates over a life-time, alongside the various chemicals one is exposed to, gives rise to cancer. Given Rad-9's extensive role in cell cycle inhibition as part of the 9-1-1 complex and its interactions with proteins responsible for DNA repair, it can be reasonably inferred that Rad-9 has many tumor suppressive roles, where its loss of function leads to tumorigenesis. The tumor suppressive aspect of Rad-9 can also be seen from its crucial functions in activating apoptosis in the case of extensive DNA damage. Given its key role, impactful Rad-9 mutations can give rise to cancer. However, the complexity of the protein's interactions is evident as Rad-9 overexpression has been linked to many forms of lung and prostate cancers. Furthermore, a number of research studies have found that the Rad-9 protein was necessary for the survival of the tumor cells. Due to the high mutation rate, replication stalls, and overall replicative stress, tumor cells are heavily reliant on DNA damage mechanisms to keep up with the division rate demands. Given these recent findings, Rad-9 has been described as a dual function protein with oncogenic properties that are necessary for the growth of specific tumor cells on the one hand, and with tumor suppressive properties that are necessary for the control of normal cell growth. Future research about the oncogenic properties of Rad-9 are necessary to reveal the full complexity of this protein and its importance to the cell cycle control system.

=== Role in meiosis ===
The RAD9A-RAD1-HUS1 (9A-1-1) complex is used to facilitate repair of DNA double-strand breaks present during meiosis In mammalian meiocytes, the RAD9A and HUS1 paralogs, RAD9B and HUS1B are also expressed and predicted to form alternative 9-1-1 complexes. These complexes promote synapsis of homologous chromosomes, repair of double-strand breaks and ATR signalling during meiosis. ATR is involved in sensing DNA damage and activating the DNA damage checkpoint, leading to cell cycle arrest in eukaryotes. In conditional knockout mouse models, the loss of Rad9a in the testis results in persistence of DNA double-strand breaks during meiotic prophase leading to smaller testis size, reduced sperm count and reduced fertility.

== History ==
Rad9 was first found as a gene that promotes G2 cell cycle arrest in response to DNA damage in Saccharomyces cerevisiae by Weinert et al. The group irradiated yeast cells to induce DNA damage and tested many different mutants. They tested 7 rad mutants and all of the mutants underwent G2 arrest as normal, except for one, the rad9 mutant. The rad9 mutant did not undergo G2 arrest and instead proceeded through the cell cycle and many of the cells died because the DNA was never repaired. From this they suspected that Rad9 is necessary to invoke G2 cell cycle arrest. To confirm this they tested a double mutant of rad9 with DNA repair deficient-strain rad52 and found that the cell failed to arrest in G2 further proving that a functioning Rad9 gene is needed to induce G2 arrest. They then used MBC, a microtubule inhibitor, to synthetically arrest the cell in G2 in order to test if the Rad9 gene was necessary to also repair DNA. The found that when the rad9 mutant was arrested in G2, irradiated to induce DNA damage, and left arrested in G2 by MBC for 4 hours, the cell was able to repair DNA and divide normally. This result suggested that Rad9 is not necessary to repair DNA. They concluded that Rad9 is an important gene that is crucial to arrest the cell in G2 and ensures fidelity of chromosome transmission but is not necessary to repair DNA.

== Interactions ==
Rad9 is activated by multiple phosphorylations by cyclin dependent kinases and activates Rad53 through Mec1 downstream. Mrc1 has also been shown to work cooperatively to recruit Rad53 to damaged DNA. After the 9-1-1 complex Rad9 is extensively phosphorylated by Mec1 which can trigger self-association of more Rad9 oligomers on the chromosomes. Further phosphorylation generates binding sites for Rad53 which also gets activated by Mec1 to pursue its target in the cell cycle control system. Rad9 doesn't do the DNA repair itself, it is just an adaptor protein that sends the signal. Rad9 has also been shown to interact with p53 and can even mimic certain functions of p53.

Rad9 has been shown to be able to bind to the same promoter region as p53 that transactivates p21, which halts progression of the cell cycle by inhibiting cyclins and CDK's. In addition to transactivating p21, Rad9 can also regulate transcription of the base excision repair gene NEIL by binding p53-like response elements in the gene promoter.

RAD9A has been shown to interact with:

- Abl gene,
- Androgen receptor,
- BCL2-like 1,
- Bcl-2,
- DNAJC7,
- HDAC1,
- HUS1
- RAD1 homolog,
- RAD17, and
- TOPBP1.

== Structure ==
The Rad9 protein contains a carboxy-terminal tandem repeat of the BRCT (BRCA1 carboxyl terminus) motif, which is found in many proteins involved in DNA damage repair. This motif is necessary for Rad9 to function. When the BRCT motif was removed, cell survival severely decreased compared to wild type Rad9. Rad9 is normally hyperphosphorylated after DNA damage. and the rad9 mutants without the BRCT motif displayed no phosphorylation so it is possible that the phosphorylation sites are located on this domain. The same mutant was also not able to phosphorylate Rad53 downstream.

The structure of the protein is complex, as it is the site of functional domains and protein interactions. Generally, the protein is composed of 391 amino acids and can be divided into 2 sub sections: the N-terminus and the C-terminus. The N-terminal has 2 Proliferating Cell Nuclear Antigen (PCNA)-like domains that serve as important binding sites to Rad-1 and Hus-1 to formulate the 9-1-1 complex. Also located in the N-terminal, the BH3 motif is crucial for binding to Bcl-2 family proteins in the mitochondria to induce apoptosis. Finally, 3-5' exonuclease activity that is vital for DNA repair. Meanwhile, The C-terminal has proline rich site, Nuclear Localization Signal(NLS), and a tail. All these regions serve as important binding sites to different components of the DNA damage response, especially the NLS, which has serine and threonine phosphorylation sites.[13]
