= DNA polymerase III holoenzyme =

Primary enzyme complex involved in prokaryotic DNA replication

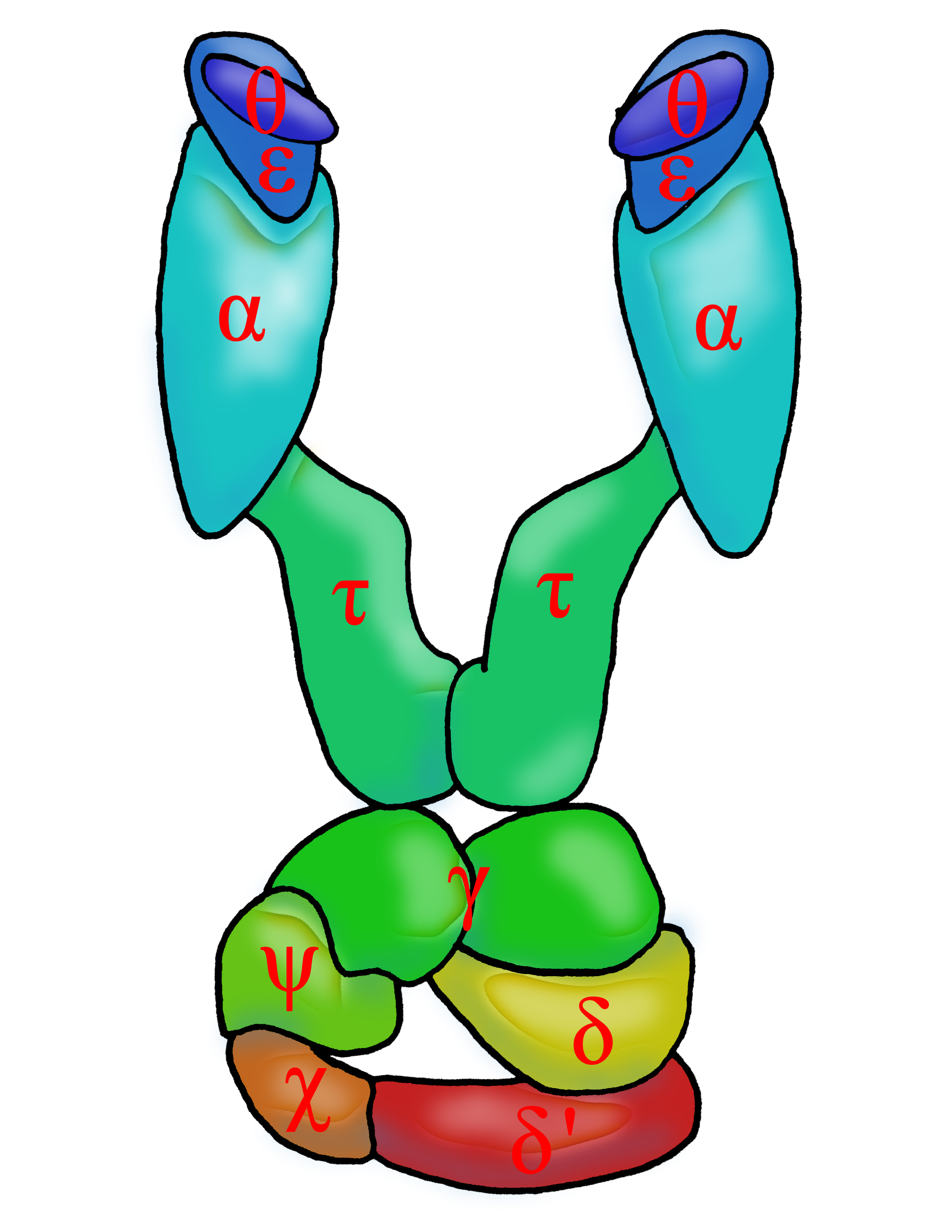
Schematic picture of DNA polymerase III* (with subunits). This is the old textbook "trombone model" with two units of Pol III.

DNA polymerase III holoenzyme is the primary enzyme complex involved in prokaryotic DNA replication. It was discovered by Thomas Kornberg (son of Arthur Kornberg) and Malcolm Gefter in 1970. The complex has high processivity (i.e. the number of nucleotides added per binding event) and, specifically referring to the replication of the E. coli genome, works in conjunction with four other DNA polymerases (Pol I, Pol II, Pol IV, and Pol V). Being the primary holoenzyme involved in replication activity, the DNA Pol III holoenzyme also has proofreading capabilities that corrects replication mistakes by means of exonuclease activity reading 3'→5' and synthesizing 5'→3'. DNA Pol III is a component of the replisome, which is located at the replication fork.

== Components ==
The replisome is composed of the following:

- 2 DNA Pol III enzymes, each comprising α, ε and θ subunits. (It has been proven that there is a third copy of Pol III at the replisome.)
  - the α subunit (encoded by the dnaE gene) has the polymerase activity.
  - the ε subunit (dnaQ) has 3'→5' exonuclease activity.
  - the θ subunit (holE) stimulates the ε subunit's proofreading.
- 2 β units (dnaN) which act as sliding DNA clamps, they keep the polymerase bound to the DNA.
- 2 τ units (dnaX) which act to dimerize two of the core enzymes (α, ε, and θ subunits).
- 1 γ unit (also dnaX) which acts as a clamp loader for the lagging strand Okazaki fragments, helping the two β subunits to form a unit and bind to DNA. The γ unit is made up of 5 γ subunits which include 3 γ subunits, 1 δ subunit (holA), and 1 δ' subunit (holB). The δ is involved in copying of the lagging strand.
- Χ (holC) and Ψ (holD) which form a 1:1 complex and bind to γ or τ. X can also mediate the switch from RNA primer to DNA.

== Activity ==
DNA polymerase III synthesizes base pairs at a rate of around 1000 nucleotides per second. DNA Pol III activity begins after strand separation at the origin of replication. Because DNA synthesis cannot start de novo, an RNA primer, complementary to part of the single-stranded DNA, is synthesized by primase (an RNA polymerase):

("!" for RNA, '"$" for DNA, "*" for polymerase)

--------> 
         * * * *
! ! ! !  _ _ _ _    
_ _ _ _ | RNA   |   <--ribose (sugar)-phosphate backbone
G U A U | Pol   |   <--RNA primer
* * * * |_ _ _ _|   <--hydrogen bonding
C A T A G C A T C C <--template ssDNA (single-stranded DNA)
_ _ _ _ _ _ _ _ _ _ <--deoxyribose (sugar)-phosphate backbone
$ $ $ $ $ $ $ $ $ $

=== Addition onto 3'OH ===
As replication progresses and the replisome moves forward, DNA polymerase III arrives at the RNA primer and begins replicating the DNA, adding onto the 3'OH of the primer:

         * * * *
! ! ! !  _ _ _ _
_ _ _ _ | DNA   |   <--deoxyribose (sugar)-phosphate backbone
G U A U | Pol   |   <--RNA primer
* * * * |_III_ _|   <--hydrogen bonding
C A T A G C A T C C <--template ssDNA (single-stranded DNA)
_ _ _ _ _ _ _ _ _ _ <--deoxyribose (sugar)-phosphate backbone
$ $ $ $ $ $ $ $ $ $

=== Synthesis of DNA ===
DNA polymerase III will then synthesize a continuous or discontinuous strand of DNA, depending if this is occurring on the leading or lagging strand (Okazaki fragment) of the DNA. DNA polymerase III has a high processivity and therefore, synthesizes DNA very quickly. This high processivity is due in part to the β-clamps that "hold" onto the DNA strands.

        ----------->
                    * * * *
! ! ! ! $ $ $ $ $ $ _ _ _ _
_ _ _ _ _ _ _ _ _ _| DNA   |   <--deoxyribose (sugar)-phosphate backbone
G U A U C G T A G G| Pol   |   <--RNA primer
* * * * * * * * * *|_III_ _|   <--hydrogen bonding
C A T A G C A T C C <--template ssDNA (single-stranded DNA)
_ _ _ _ _ _ _ _ _ _ <--deoxyribose (sugar)-phosphate backbone
$ $ $ $ $ $ $ $ $ $

=== Removal of primer ===
After replication of the desired region, the RNA primer is removed by DNA polymerase I via the process of nick translation. The removal of the RNA primer allows DNA ligase to ligate the DNA-DNA nick between the new fragment and the previous strand. DNA polymerase I & III, along with many other enzymes are all required for the high fidelity, high-processivity of DNA replication.

== See also ==
- Beta clamp
- DNA polymerase
- DNA replication
