= HUS1 =

Protein-coding gene in the species Homo sapiens

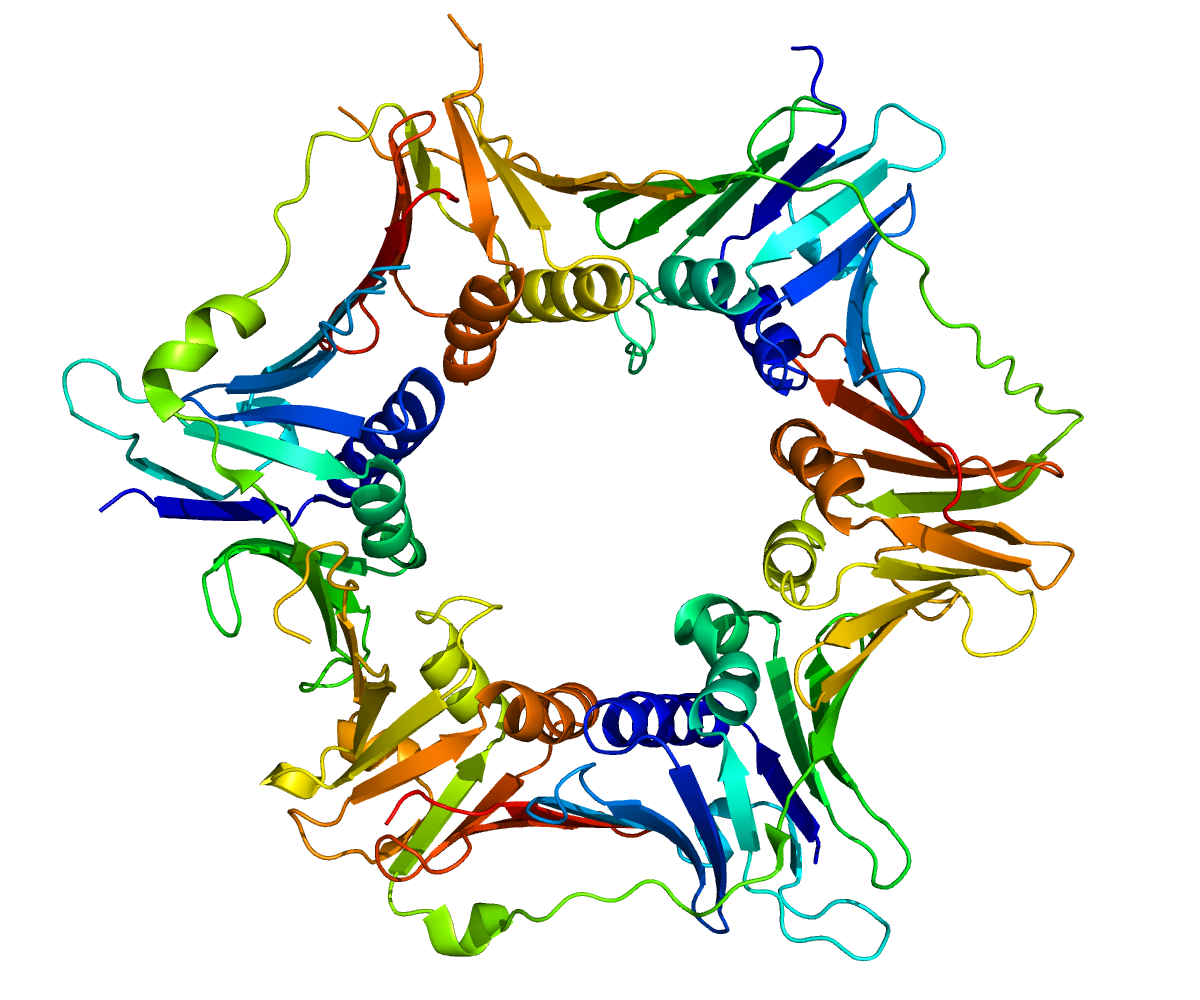
Available structures
PDB	Ortholog search: PDBe RCSB
PDB	List of PDB id codes 3A1J, 3G65, 3GGR

Identifiers
- Aliases: HUS1, hHUS1 checkpoint clamp component
- External IDs: OMIM: 603760; MGI: 1277962; HomoloGene: 37932; GeneCards: HUS1; OMA:HUS1 - orthologs

Gene location (Human)
Chr.	Chromosome 7 (human)
Band	7p12.3	Start	47,963,288 bp
Band	7p12.3	End	47,979,615 bp

Gene location (Mouse)
Chr.	Chromosome 11 (mouse)
Band	11 A1|11 5.74 cM	Start	8,943,137 bp
Band	11 A1|11 5.74 cM	End	8,961,191 bp
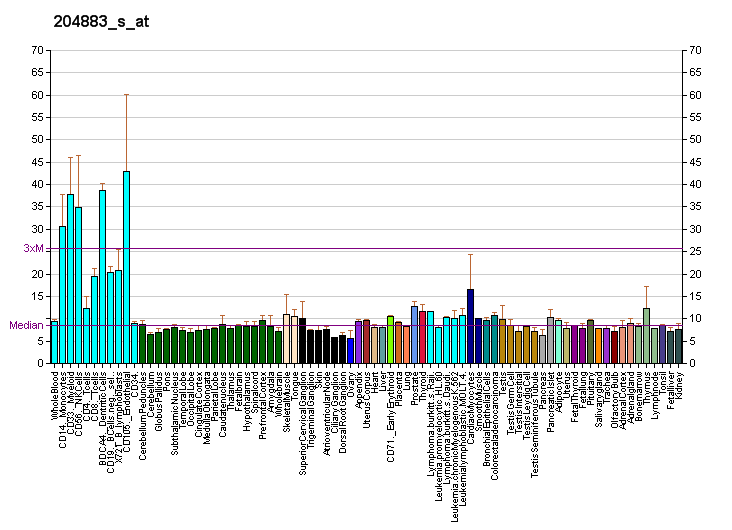

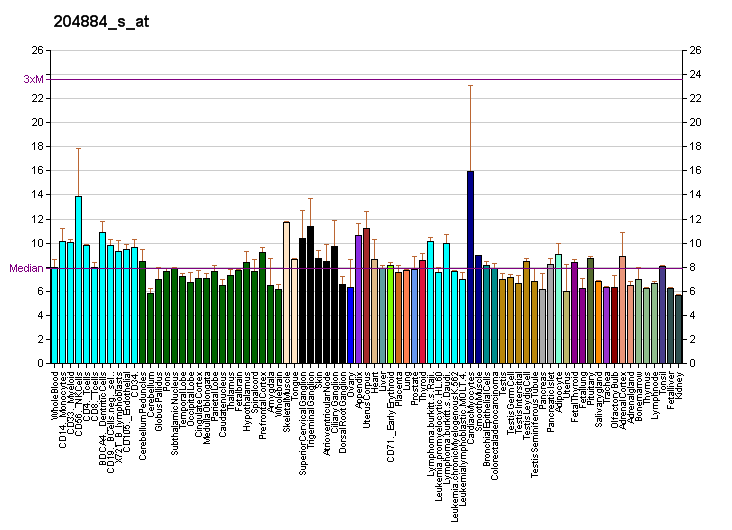

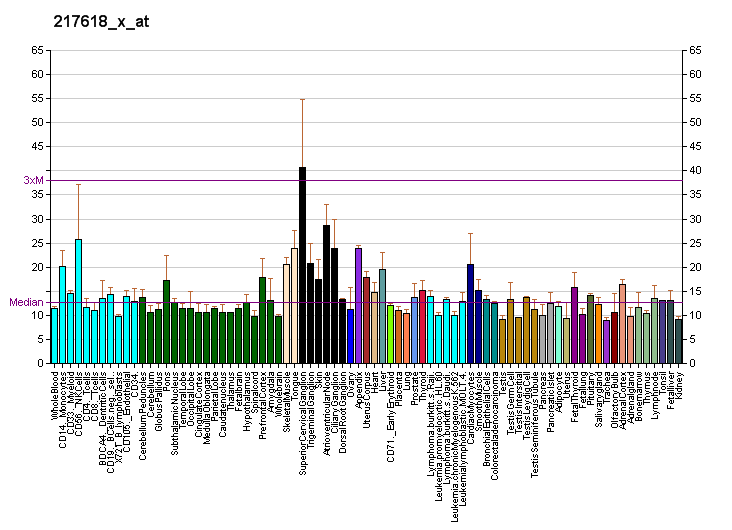
RNA expression pattern
Bgee	Human / Mouse (ortholog); Top expressed in: gonad; monocyte; sural nerve; Achilles tendon; islet of Langerhans; rectum; epithelium of colon; muscle of thigh; gastrocnemius muscle; stromal cell of endometrium / Top expressed in: secondary oocyte; primary oocyte; zygote; tail of embryo; genital tubercle; primitive streak; substantia nigra; proximal tubule; ureter; abdominal wall; More reference expression data
BioGPS	More reference expression data
Gene ontology
Molecular function	protein binding
Cellular component	site of double-strand break; cytoplasm; cytosol; nucleoplasm; checkpoint clamp complex; nucleolus; nucleus
Biological process	regulation of protein phosphorylation; nucleotide-excision repair; meiotic DNA integrity checkpoint signaling; embryo development; mitotic cell cycle checkpoint signaling; mitotic intra-S DNA damage checkpoint signaling; negative regulation of DNA replication; cellular response to DNA damage stimulus; protein phosphorylation; mitotic DNA replication checkpoint signaling; cellular response to ionizing radiation; response to UV; double-strand break repair via homologous recombination; DNA damage checkpoint signaling; DNA repair; embryo development ending in birth or egg hatching; telomere maintenance; DNA replication; regulation of signal transduction by p53 class mediator
Sources:Amigo / QuickGO
Orthologs
Species	Human	Mouse
Entrez	3364	15574
Ensembl	ENSG00000136273	ENSMUSG00000020413
UniProt	O60921	Q8BQY8
RefSeq (mRNA)	NM_004507; NM_001363683	NM_008316; NM_001303532; NM_001303610
RefSeq (protein)	NP_004498; NP_001350612	NP_001290461; NP_001290539; NP_032342
Location (UCSC)	Chr 7: 47.96 – 47.98 Mb	Chr 11: 8.94 – 8.96 Mb
PubMed search
- Wikidata
View/Edit Human	View/Edit Mouse

Checkpoint protein HUS1 is a protein that in humans is encoded by the HUS1 gene.

== Function ==
The protein encoded by this gene is a component of an evolutionarily conserved, genotoxin-activated checkpoint complex that is involved in the cell cycle arrest in response to DNA damage. This protein forms a heterotrimeric complex with checkpoint proteins RAD9 and RAD1. In response to DNA damage, the trimeric complex interacts with another protein complex consisting of checkpoint protein RAD17 and four small subunits of the replication factor C (RFC), which loads the combined complex onto the chromatin. The DNA damage induced chromatin binding has been shown to depend on the activation of the checkpoint kinase ATM, and is thought to be an early checkpoint signaling event.

=== In somatic cells ===
In somatic cells the RAD9-RAD1-HUS1 (9-1-1) complex responds to DNA damage by promoting DNA repair.

=== In meiosis ===
In flies, worms and yeast, the 9-1-1 complex is necessary for meiotic checkpoint function and efficient meiotic recombination. During mammalian meiosis 9-1-1 complexes promote synapsis of homologous chromosomes, double-strand break repair and cell cycle checkpoint signalling.

== Interactions ==
HUS1 has been shown to interact with:

- HDAC1,
- PCNA,
- RAD1 homolog
- RAD17, and
- RAD9A.
