= Cell cycle checkpoint protein RAD1 =

Protein-coding gene in the species Homo sapiens

An Error has occurred retrieving Wikidata item for infobox Cell cycle checkpoint protein RAD1 is a protein that in humans is encoded by the RAD1 gene.

== Function ==
This gene encodes a component of a heterotrimeric cell cycle checkpoint complex, known as the 9-1-1 complex, that is activated to stop cell cycle progression in response to DNA damage or incomplete DNA replication. The 9-1-1 complex is recruited by RAD17 to affected sites where it may attract specialized DNA polymerases and other DNA repair effectors. Alternatively spliced transcript variants encoding different isoforms of this gene have been described.

=== Meiosis ===
During meiosis, double-strand breaks occur in DNA that initiate recombination. Recombination is a process that repairs the breaks and also promotes faithful chromosome segregation. In yeast the 9-1-1 complex (including RAD1) facilitates meiotic recombination. An alternative, but inaccurate, mechanism for repairing double-strand breaks is non-homologous end joining. In the rice plant, the 9-1-1 complex promotes accurate meiotic recombination by suppressing the alternative process of non-homologous end joining.

During mammalian meiosis 9-1-1 complexes promote synapsis of homologous chromosomes. Testis-specific disruption of RAD1 in mice results in defective double-strand break repair, depletion of germ cells and infertility.

== Interactions ==
RAD1 homolog has been shown to interact with:

- HUS1,
- RAD17, and
- RAD9A,
