= Fibrobacter-1 RNA motif =

Fibrobacter-1
- Consensus secondary structure and sequence conservation of Fibrobacter-1 RNA

Identifiers
- Symbol: Fibrobacter-1
- Rfam: RF02983

Other data
- RNA type: Gene; sRNA
- SO: SO:0001263
- PDB structures: PDBe

The Fibrobacter-1 RNA motif is a conserved RNA structure that was discovered by bioinformatics. Fibrobacter-1 motifs are found in organisms in the genus Fibrobacter, and in many metagenomic sequences.

It is ambiguous whether Fibrobacter-1 RNAs function as cis-regulatory elements or whether they operate in trans. They are frequently located upstream of ribonuclease E (RNase E) genes, which is consistent with a cis-regulatory function. Additional cis-regulatory RNAs upstream of RNase E genes have already been established in other lineages of bacteria, e.g., the RNase E 5' UTR element. Some instances of the Fibrobacter-1 RNA motif are not located upstream of protein-coding genes. This observation could indicate that the RNAs function in trans as small RNAs. However, the affected instances are in metagenomic sequences, where sequence assembly is often imperfect. Therefore, they could also reflect technical artifacts, and not be biological.
