= Exosome component 9 =

Protein-coding gene in the species Homo sapiens

EXOSC9
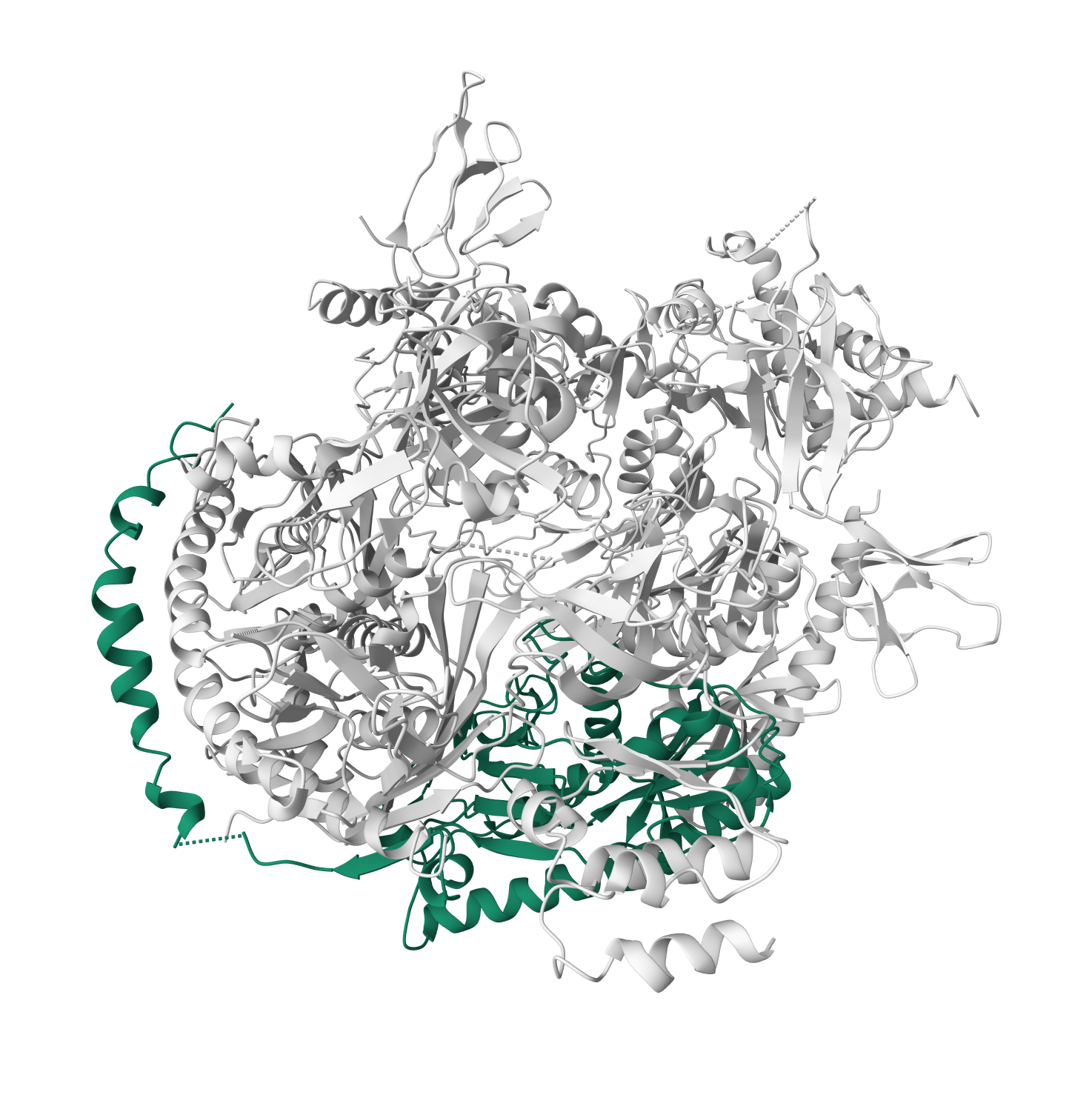

Identifiers
- Aliases: EXOSC9, PM/Scl-75, PMSCL1, RRP45, Rrp45p, p5, p6, Exosome component 9, PCH1D
- External IDs: OMIM: 606180; MGI: 1355319; GeneCards: EXOSC9
Available structures
PDB	Ortholog search: PDBe RCSB
PDB	List of PDB id codes 2NN6

Gene location (Human)
Chr.	Chromosome 4 (human)
Band	4q27	Start	121,801,318 bp
Band	4q27	End	121,817,021 bp

Gene location (Mouse)
Chr.	Chromosome 3 (mouse)
Band	3|3 B	Start	36,606,755 bp
Band	3|3 B	End	36,619,876 bp
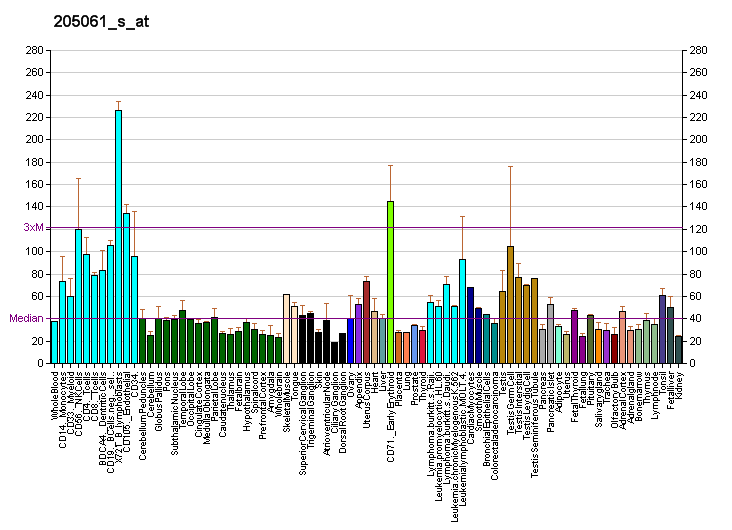
RNA expression pattern
Bgee	Human / Mouse (ortholog); Top expressed in: secondary oocyte; Achilles tendon; gonad; testicle; buccal mucosa cell; left testis; right testis; ventricular zone; ganglionic eminence; lymph node / Top expressed in: otic vesicle; otic placode; saccule; Paneth cell; ventricular zone; trigeminal ganglion; spermatocyte; tail of embryo; endothelial cell of lymphatic vessel; condyle; More reference expression data
BioGPS	More reference expression data
Gene ontology
Molecular function	3'-5'-exoribonuclease activity; exoribonuclease activity; protein binding; RNA binding; mRNA 3'-UTR AU-rich region binding
Cellular component	cytoplasm; cytosol; exosome (RNase complex); nuclear exosome (RNase complex); nuclear chromosome; nucleolus; extracellular exosome; nucleus; nucleoplasm; cytoplasmic exosome (RNase complex)
Biological process	RNA processing; regulation of mRNA stability; nuclear polyadenylation-dependent rRNA catabolic process; nuclear-transcribed mRNA catabolic process; positive regulation of cell growth; nuclear mRNA surveillance; immune response; exonucleolytic catabolism of deadenylated mRNA; positive regulation of transcription by RNA polymerase II; rRNA processing; exonucleolytic trimming to generate mature 3'-end of 5.8S rRNA from tricistronic rRNA transcript (SSU-rRNA, 5.8S rRNA, LSU-rRNA); nuclear-transcribed mRNA catabolic process, exonucleolytic, 3'-5'; U1 snRNA 3'-end processing; U4 snRNA 3'-end processing; U5 snRNA 3'-end processing; nuclear polyadenylation-dependent tRNA catabolic process; nuclear polyadenylation-dependent mRNA catabolic process; rRNA catabolic process
Sources:Amigo / QuickGO
Orthologs
Databases	NCBI: entry; OMA: entry
Species	Human	Mouse
Entrez	5393	50911
Ensembl	ENSG00000123737	ENSMUSG00000027714
UniProt	Q06265	Q9JHI7
RefSeq (mRNA)	NM_001034194; NM_005033	NM_019393
RefSeq (protein)	NP_001029366; NP_005024	NP_062266
Location (UCSC)	Chr 4: 121.8 – 121.82 Mb	Chr 3: 36.61 – 36.62 Mb
PubMed search
- Wikidata
View/Edit Human	View/Edit Mouse

Exosome component 9, also known as EXOSC9, is a human gene, the protein product of which (sometimes called RRP45 or PM/Scl-75) is part of the exosome complex and is an autoantigen is patients with certain auto immune diseases, most notably scleromyositis.
