= TRAMP complex =

Multiprotein and heterotrimeric complex

TRAMP complex (Trf4/Air2/Mtr4p Polyadenylation complex) is a multiprotein, heterotrimeric complex having distributive polyadenylation activity and identifies wide varieties of RNAs produced by polymerases. It was originally discovered in Saccharomyces cerevisiae by LaCava et al., Vanacova et al. and Wyers et al. in 2005. The analogous complex in humans is sometimes referred to as the TRAMP-like complex (see § In humans).

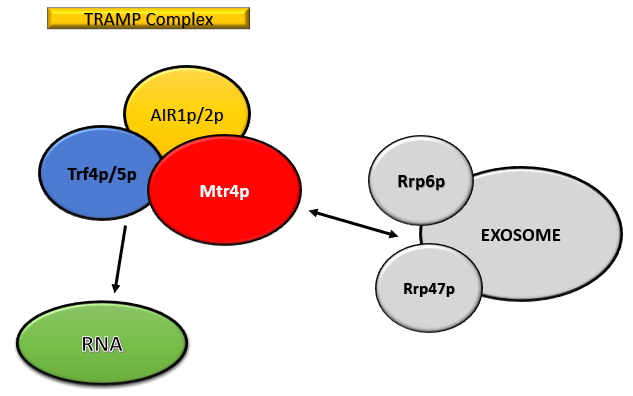
The TRAMP complex consists of RNA helicase (Mtr4/Dob1), a poly(A) polymerase (either Trf4 or Trf5) and a zinc knuckle protein (either Air1 or Air2).The interaction between the exosomes (Rrp6p/Rrp47p) and Mtr4p of TRAMP complex helps in RNA surveillance and degradation of abnormal RNAs

It interacts with the exosome complex in the nucleus of eukaryotic cells and is involved in the 3' end processing and degradation of ribosomal RNA and snoRNAs. The TRAMP complex trims the poly(A) tails of RNAs destined for Rrp6 and the core exosome down to 4-5 adenosines assisting in transcript recognition and exosome complex activation. The substrate specificity of exosomes is improved in the presence of TRAMP complex as it acts as a crucial cofactor and helps in maintaining various activities.

In this way, TRAMP plays a critical role in ridding the cell of noncoding transcripts generated through pervasive RNA polymerase II transcription, as well as functioning in the biogenesis and turnover of functional coding and noncoding RNAs.

TRAMP complex also affects various other RNA processes either directly or indirectly. It is involved in RNA export, Splicing, hetero-chromatic gene silencing and helps in maintaining stability of genome.

== Components ==
=== Non-Canonical Poly(A) Polymerases ===
Pol(A) Polymerases showed various genetic interactions with DNA Topoisomerases Top1p and hence they were called topoisomerase-related function Trf4p and Trf5p due to this interaction with DNA it has an important part in genomic stability. In the cell Trf4p is in higher concentration as compared to Trf5p and also has a stronger effect on the phenotype. Trf4p is present throughout the nucleus while Trf5p is mainly found mainly in nucleolus. The Trf4p structure consists of a central domain and a catalytic domain which is similar to the structure of canonical polymerases.

The non-canonical Poly(A) polymerases (Trf4p or Trf5p) of the TRAMP complex which belong to the Cid1 family do not contain RNA recognition motif (RRM) therefore additional proteins like Air1/Air2 are required by the non-canonical polymerases for polyadenylation.

=== Zinc knuckle proteins ===
The zinc knuckle proteins Air1p/Air2p (Arginine methyltransferase-interacting RING-finger protein) are mainly involved in the binding of RNAs. There are five CCHC (C stands for Cysteine and H stands for Histidine) zinc knuckle motifs which are present in between the C and N terminals.

In Air2p proteins, the fourth and fifth zinc knuckle have different roles. The fourth zinc knuckle have a role in RNA binding while the fifth knuckle is important for protein-protein interactions. Air2p interacts with the central domain of Trf4p and polyadenylation activity of Trf4p is dependent on this interaction as deletion or mutation of the knuckles hinders the polyadenylation activity. Air1p is responsible for inhibiting methylation of Npl3p (a protein which is responsible mRNA export). Air1p/Air2p also direct abnormal mRNPs to TRAMP pathway and bring about their degradation.

=== Ski2 like helicase Mtr4p ===
The Ski2 like helicase Mtr4p was discovered during the screening of heat resistant mutants that gather Poly(A) RNA in the nucleus and is mainly involved in unwinding activity. Mtr4p (also called as Dob1p) is an SF2 helicase and belongs to DExH-box RNA helicases family consisting of two RecA like domains. It also consists of WH domain (Winged Helix domain), an Arch domain (also called as stalk and KOW domain [Kyprides, Ouzounis, Woese domain]) and helical bundle domain. The packing of the WH and helical bundle domains on surface of the helicase core results in the formation of a channel for ssRNA.

Mtr4p requires ATP or dATP hydrolysis for RNA duplex unwinding mediated by Q-motif. A single-stranded region 3' to the paired region is also essential for the unwinding activity of Mtr4p. Through direct contact with various components of exosome, Mtr4p helps in proper addition of RNA substrates of TRAMP complex to nuclear exosome.

== Difference between canonical and non-canonical polymerases ==
The difference between non-canonical and canonical Poly(A) Polymerases is that canonical polymerases help in maintaining mRNAs and its activity is regulated by a specific sequence in the mRNA while polyadenylation of non-canonical polymerases uses a different regulated sequence in the RNA and specifies RNAs for degeneration or processing. Canonical polymerases belong to DNA polymerase β superfamily whereas non-canonical polymerases belong to Cid1 family, another main difference is the length of the poly(A) tail; canonical polymerases can add many adenylates thus the RNA produced has longer poly(A) tails while non-canonical polymerases on the other hand can produce RNAs with shorter length of poly(A) tails as they can add only few adenylates.

== Interaction with 3’->5’ exonuclease complex exosome ==
The TRAMP complex brings about degradation or processing of various RNAs with the help of 3’->5’ exonuclease complex called the exosome. A hexameric ring of RNase PH domain proteins, Rrp41p, Rrp42p, Rrp43p, Rrp45p, Rrp46p and Mtr3p comprises the exosome of S. cerevisiae. The exosome can bring about RNA degradation more efficiently in the presence of Rrp6p with the help of TRAMP complex in vitro. Also, RNA degradation is enhanced in the presence of various exosome cofactors which are recruited co-transcriptionally.

The Ski complex consisting of Ski2p, Ski3p, Ski8p is required by cytoplasmic exosome for all mRNA degradation pathways. The cytoplasmic exosome along with the Ski7p protein attaches to various abnormal ribosomes and mRNAs and brings about their degradation.

== Inter-relation between components ==
All the components of the TRAMP complex are inter-related to each other. For the activity of Poly(A) polymerases like Trf4p/Trf5p, zinc knuckle proteins are essential. In similar way RNA degradation brought about by exosomes is stimulated by unwinding activity of Ski2 like helicases and Mtr4p which acts as a cofactor. The unwinding activity of Mtr4p is improved by the Trf4p/Air2p in the TRAMP complex. Mtr4p also has an important role in maintaining and controlling the length of Poly(A) tails. But destruction or absence of Mtr4p results in hyperadenylation and hinders the length of Poly(A) tails.

A complex formed between Trf5p, Air1p and Mtr4p is called as TRAMP5 complex. In S. cerevisiae there are two types of TRAMP complexes depending on the presence of polymerases. If Trf4p is present, then the complex is called as TRAMP4 and if Trf5p is present then It is called as TRAMP5.

== RNA substrates ==
RNAs produced by all three polymerases (Pol I, II, III) act as substrates for TRAMP complex. TRAMP complex is involved in processing and surveillance of various RNAs and degrade abnormal RNAs. Different type of RNA substrates include ribosomal RNAs (rRNAs), small nucleolar RNAs (snoRNAs), transfer RNAs (tRNAs), small nuclear RNAs (snRNAs), Long transcripts of RNA polymerase II (Pol II) etc. But the mechanism by which TRAMP complex identifies various substrates is unknown.

The TRAMP complex works more efficiently in RNA processing by engaging Exosome complex exonuclease RrP6 wherein Nab3(RNA binding protein) plays a crucial role.

== Role in maintaining chromatin ==
Post-transcriptional modifications due to various enzymes like methyltransferase Hmt1p (Rmt1p) may have an indirect effect on chromatin maintenance. The chromatin structures are affected when RNA substrates of TRAMP complex are transcribed across the genome. Various TRAMP components interact physically and genetically with various proteins and bring about changes in chromatin and DNA metabolism.

== Conservation of TRAMP-mediated processes ==
Components of the TRAMP complex in Saccharomyces cerevisiae are conserved in other organisms ranging from yeast to mammals. The TRAMP complex components of Schizosaccharomyces pombe including Cid14p, Air1p, and Mtr4p are functionally similar to the components of TRAMP complex in S. cerevisiae.

== In humans ==
The TRAMP complex in humans (sometimes referred to as the TRAMP-like complex) consists of various components including the helicase MTR4, a non-canonical poly(A) polymerase TENT4A (uniprot: Q5XG87) or TENT4B (uniprot: Q8NDF8), and a Zinc knuckle protein human ZCCHC7 (uniprot: Q8N3Z6), RNA binding protein hRbm7p.
