= Polyadenylation =

Addition of adenylic acids to 3' end of mature mRNA

Typical structure of a mature eukaryotic mRNA

Polyadenylation is the addition of a poly(A) tail to an RNA transcript, typically a messenger RNA (mRNA). The poly(A) tail consists of multiple adenosine monophosphates; in other words, it is a stretch of RNA that has only adenine bases. In eukaryotes, polyadenylation is part of the process that produces mature mRNA for translation. In many bacteria, the poly(A) tail promotes degradation of the mRNA. It, therefore, forms part of the larger process of gene expression.

The process of polyadenylation begins as the transcription of a gene terminates. The 3′-most segment of the newly made pre-mRNA is first cleaved off by a set of proteins; these proteins then synthesize the poly(A) tail at the RNA's 3′ end. In some genes these proteins add a poly(A) tail at one of several possible sites. Therefore, polyadenylation can produce more than one transcript from a single gene (alternative polyadenylation), similar to alternative splicing.

The poly(A) tail is important for the nuclear export, translation and stability of mRNA. The tail is shortened over time, and, when it is short enough, the mRNA is enzymatically degraded. However, in a few cell types, mRNAs with short poly(A) tails are stored for later activation by re-polyadenylation in the cytosol. In contrast, when polyadenylation occurs in bacteria, it promotes RNA degradation. This is also sometimes the case for eukaryotic non-coding RNAs.

mRNA molecules in both prokaryotes and eukaryotes have polyadenylated 3′-ends, with the prokaryotic poly(A) tails generally shorter and fewer mRNA molecules polyadenylated.

== Background on RNA ==
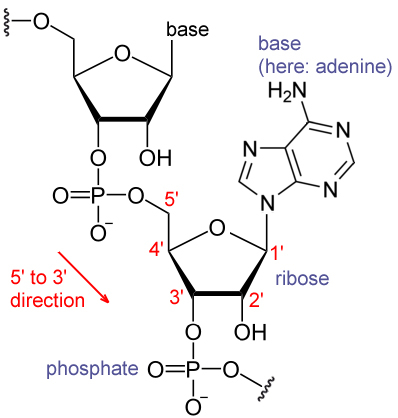
Chemical structure of RNA. The sequence of bases differs between RNA molecules.

RNAs are a type of large biological molecules, whose individual building blocks are called nucleotides. The name poly(A) tail (for polyadenylic acid tail) reflects the way RNA nucleotides are abbreviated, with a letter for the base the nucleotide contains (A for adenine, C for cytosine, G for guanine and U for uracil). RNAs are produced (transcribed) from a DNA template. By convention, RNA sequences are written in a 5′ to 3′ direction. The 5′ end is the part of the RNA molecule that is transcribed first, and the 3′ end is transcribed last. The 3′ end is also where the poly(A) tail is found on polyadenylated RNAs.

Messenger RNA (mRNA) is RNA that has a coding region that acts as a template for protein synthesis (translation). The rest of the mRNA, the untranslated regions, tune how active the mRNA is. There are also many RNAs that are not translated, called non-coding RNAs. Like the untranslated regions, many of these non-coding RNAs have regulatory roles.

== Nuclear polyadenylation ==
=== Function ===
In nuclear polyadenylation, a poly(A) tail is added to an RNA at the end of transcription. On mRNAs, the poly(A) tail aids in transcription termination, export of the mRNA from the nucleus and translation by acting as a binding site of PABPC1. Almost all eukaryotic mRNAs are polyadenylated, with the exception of animal replication-dependent histone mRNAs. These are the only mRNAs in eukaryotes that lack a poly(A) tail, ending instead in a stem-loop structure followed by a purine-rich sequence, termed histone downstream element, that directs where the RNA is cut so that the 3′ end of the histone mRNA is formed.

Many eukaryotic non-coding RNAs are always polyadenylated at the end of transcription. There are small RNAs where the poly(A) tail is seen only in intermediary forms and not in the mature RNA as the ends are removed during processing, the notable ones being microRNAs. But, for many long noncoding RNAs – a seemingly large group of regulatory RNAs that, for example, includes the RNA Xist, which mediates X chromosome inactivation – a poly(A) tail is part of the mature RNA.

=== Mechanism ===
Proteins involved:

CPSF: cleavage/polyadenylation specificity factor
CstF: cleavage stimulation factor
PAP: polyadenylate polymerase
PABII: polyadenylate binding protein 2
CFI: cleavage factor I
CFII: cleavage factor II

The processive polyadenylation complex in the nucleus of eukaryotes works on products of RNA polymerase II, such as precursor mRNA. Here, a multi-protein complex (see components on the right) cleaves the 3′-most part of a newly produced RNA and polyadenylates the end produced by this cleavage. The cleavage is catalysed by the enzyme CPSF and occurs 10–30 nucleotides downstream of its binding site. This site often has the polyadenylation signal sequence AAUAAA on the RNA, but variants of it that bind more weakly to CPSF exist. Two other proteins add specificity to the binding to an RNA: CstF and CFI. CstF binds to a GU-rich region further downstream of CPSF's site. CFI recognises a third site on the RNA (a set of UGUAA sequences in mammals) and can recruit CPSF even if the AAUAAA sequence is missing. The polyadenylation signal – the sequence motif recognised by the RNA cleavage complex – varies between groups of eukaryotes. Most human polyadenylation sites contain the AAUAAA sequence, but this sequence is less common in plants and fungi.

The RNA is typically cleaved before transcription termination, as CstF also binds to RNA polymerase II. Through a poorly understood mechanism (as of 2002), it signals for RNA polymerase II to slip off of the transcript. Cleavage also involves the protein CFII, though it is unknown how. The cleavage site associated with a polyadenylation signal can vary up to some 50 nucleotides.

When the RNA is cleaved, polyadenylation starts, catalysed by polyadenylate polymerase. Polyadenylate polymerase builds the poly(A) tail by adding adenosine monophosphate units from adenosine triphosphate to the RNA, cleaving off pyrophosphate. Another protein, PAB2, binds to the new, short poly(A) tail and increases the affinity of polyadenylate polymerase for the RNA. When the poly(A) tail is approximately 250 nucleotides long the enzyme can no longer bind to CPSF and polyadenylation stops, thus determining the length of the poly(A) tail. CPSF is in contact with RNA polymerase II, allowing it to signal the polymerase to terminate transcription. When RNA polymerase II reaches a "termination sequence" (⁵'TTTATT^{3}' on the DNA template and ⁵'AAUAAA^{3}' on the primary transcript), the end of transcription is signaled. The polyadenylation machinery is also physically linked to the spliceosome, a complex that removes introns from RNAs.

=== Downstream effects ===
The poly(A) tail acts as the binding site for poly(A)-binding protein. Poly(A)-binding protein promotes export from the nucleus and translation, and inhibits degradation. This protein binds to the poly(A) tail prior to mRNA export from the nucleus and in yeast also recruits poly(A) nuclease, an enzyme that shortens the poly(A) tail and allows the export of the mRNA. Poly(A)-binding protein is exported to the cytoplasm with the RNA. mRNAs that are not exported are degraded by the exosome. Poly(A)-binding protein also can bind to, and thus recruit, several proteins that affect translation, one of these is initiation factor-4G, which in turn recruits the 40S ribosomal subunit. However, a poly(A) tail is not required for the translation of all mRNAs. Further, poly(A) tailing (oligo-adenylation) can determine the fate of RNA molecules that are usually not poly(A)-tailed (such as (small) non-coding (sn)RNAs etc.) and thereby induce their RNA decay.

=== Deadenylation ===
In eukaryotic somatic cells, the poly(A) tails of most mRNAs in the cytoplasm gradually get shorter, and mRNAs with shorter poly(A) tail are translated less and degraded sooner. However, it can take many hours before an mRNA is degraded. This deadenylation and degradation process can be accelerated by microRNAs complementary to the 3′ untranslated region of an mRNA. In immature egg cells, mRNAs with shortened poly(A) tails are not degraded, but are instead stored and translationally inactive. These short tailed mRNAs are activated by cytoplasmic polyadenylation after fertilisation, during egg activation.

In animals, poly(A) ribonuclease (PARN) can bind to the 5′ cap and remove nucleotides from the poly(A) tail. The level of access to the 5′ cap and poly(A) tail is important in controlling how soon the mRNA is degraded. PARN deadenylates less if the RNA is bound by the initiation factors 4E (at the 5′ cap) and 4G (at the poly(A) tail), which is why translation reduces deadenylation. The rate of deadenylation may also be regulated by RNA-binding proteins. Additionally, RNA triple helix structures and RNA motifs such as the poly(A) tail 3' end binding pocket retard deadenylation process and inhibit poly(A) tail removal. Once the poly(A) tail is removed, the decapping complex removes the 5′ cap, leading to a degradation of the RNA. Several other proteins are involved in deadenylation in budding yeast and human cells, most notably the CCR4-Not complex.

== Cytoplasmic polyadenylation ==
There is polyadenylation in the cytosol of some animal cell types, namely in the germline, during early embryogenesis and in post-synaptic sites of nerve cells. This lengthens the poly(A) tail of an mRNA with a shortened poly(A) tail, so that the mRNA will be translated. These shortened poly(A) tails are often less than 20 nucleotides, and are lengthened to around 80–150 nucleotides.

In the early mouse embryo, cytoplasmic polyadenylation of maternal RNAs from the egg cell allows the cell to survive and grow even though transcription does not start until the middle of the 2-cell stage (4-cell stage in human). In the brain, cytoplasmic polyadenylation is active during learning and could play a role in long-term potentiation, which is the strengthening of the signal transmission from a nerve cell to another in response to nerve impulses and is important for learning and memory formation.

Cytoplasmic polyadenylation requires the RNA-binding proteins CPSF and CPEB, and can involve other RNA-binding proteins like Pumilio. Depending on the cell type, the polymerase can be the same type of polyadenylate polymerase (PAP) that is used in the nuclear process, or the cytoplasmic polymerase GLD-2.

Results of using different polyadenylation sites on the same gene

== Alternative polyadenylation ==
Many protein-coding genes have more than one polyadenylation site, so a gene can code for several mRNAs that differ in their 3′ end. The 3' region of a transcript contains many polyadenylation signals (PAS). When more proximal (closer towards 5' end) PAS sites are utilized, this shortens the length of the 3' untranslated region (3' UTR) of a transcript. Studies in both humans and flies have shown tissue specific APA. With neuronal tissues preferring distal PAS usage, leading to longer 3' UTRs and testis tissues preferring proximal PAS leading to shorter 3' UTRs. Studies have shown there is a correlation between a gene's conservation level and its tendency to do alternative polyadenylation, with highly conserved genes exhibiting more APA. Similarly, highly expressed genes follow this same pattern. Ribo-sequencing data (sequencing of only mRNAs inside ribosomes) has shown that mRNA isoforms with shorter 3' UTRs are more likely to be translated.

Since alternative polyadenylation changes the length of the 3' UTR, it can also change which binding sites are available for microRNAs in the 3′ UTR. MicroRNAs tend to repress translation and promote degradation of the mRNAs they bind to, although there are examples of microRNAs that stabilise transcripts. Alternative polyadenylation can also shorten the coding region, thus making the mRNA code for a different protein, but this is much less common than just shortening the 3′ untranslated region.

The choice of poly(A) site can be influenced by extracellular stimuli and depends on the expression of the proteins that take part in polyadenylation. For example, the expression of CstF-64, a subunit of cleavage stimulatory factor (CstF), increases in macrophages in response to lipopolysaccharides (a group of bacterial compounds that trigger an immune response). This results in the selection of weak poly(A) sites and thus shorter transcripts. This removes regulatory elements in the 3′ untranslated regions of mRNAs for defense-related products like lysozyme and TNF-α. These mRNAs then have longer half-lives and produce more of these proteins. RNA-binding proteins other than those in the polyadenylation machinery can also affect whether a polyadenylation site is used, as can DNA methylation near the polyadenylation signal. In addition, numerous other components involved in transcription, splicing or other mechanisms regulating RNA biology can affect APA.

== Tagging for degradation in eukaryotes ==
For many non-coding RNAs, including tRNA, rRNA, snRNA, and snoRNA, polyadenylation is a way of marking the RNA for degradation, at least in yeast. This polyadenylation is done in the nucleus by the TRAMP complex, which maintains a tail that is around four nucleotides long on the 3′ end. The RNA is then degraded by the exosome. Poly(A) tails have also been found on human rRNA fragments, both the form of homopolymeric (A only) and heteropolymeric (mostly A) tails.

== In prokaryotes and organelles ==
Polyadenylation in bacteria helps polynucleotide phosphorylase degrade past secondary structure

In many bacteria, both mRNAs and non-coding RNAs can be polyadenylated. This poly(A) tail promotes degradation by the degradosome, which contains two RNA-degrading enzymes: polynucleotide phosphorylase and RNase E. Polynucleotide phosphorylase binds to the 3′ end of RNAs and the 3′ extension provided by the poly(A) tail allows it to bind to the RNAs whose secondary structure would otherwise block the 3′ end. Successive rounds of polyadenylation and degradation of the 3′ end by polynucleotide phosphorylase allows the degradosome to overcome these secondary structures. The poly(A) tail can also recruit RNases that cut the RNA in two. These bacterial poly(A) tails are about 30 nucleotides long.

In as different groups as animals and trypanosomes, the mitochondria contain both stabilising and destabilising poly(A) tails. Destabilising polyadenylation targets both mRNA and noncoding RNAs. The poly(A) tails are 43 nucleotides long on average. The stabilising ones start at the stop codon, and without them the stop codon (UAA) is not complete as the genome only encodes the U or UA part. Plant mitochondria have only destabilising polyadenylation. Mitochondrial polyadenylation has never been observed in either budding or fission yeast.

While many bacteria and mitochondria have polyadenylate polymerases, they also have another type of polyadenylation, performed by polynucleotide phosphorylase itself. This enzyme is found in bacteria, mitochondria, plastids and as a constituent of the archaeal exosome (in those archaea that have an exosome). It can synthesise a 3′ extension where the vast majority of the bases are adenines. Like in bacteria, polyadenylation by polynucleotide phosphorylase promotes degradation of the RNA in plastids and likely also archaea.

== Evolution ==
Although polyadenylation is seen in almost all organisms, it is not universal. However, the wide distribution of this modification and the fact that it is present in organisms from all three domains of life implies that the last universal common ancestor of all living organisms, it is presumed, had some form of polyadenylation system. A few organisms do not polyadenylate mRNA, which implies that they have lost their polyadenylation machineries during evolution. Although no examples of eukaryotes that lack polyadenylation are known, mRNAs from the bacterium Mycoplasma gallisepticum and the salt-tolerant archaean Haloferax volcanii lack this modification.

The most ancient polyadenylating enzyme is polynucleotide phosphorylase. This enzyme is part of both the bacterial degradosome and the archaeal exosome, two closely related complexes that recycle RNA into nucleotides. This enzyme degrades RNA by attacking the bond between the 3′-most nucleotides with a phosphate, breaking off a diphosphate nucleotide. This reaction is reversible, and so the enzyme can also extend RNA with more nucleotides. The heteropolymeric tail added by polynucleotide phosphorylase is very rich in adenine. The choice of adenine is most likely the result of higher ADP concentrations than other nucleotides as a result of using ATP as an energy currency, making it more likely to be incorporated in this tail in early lifeforms. It has been suggested that the involvement of adenine-rich tails in RNA degradation prompted the later evolution of polyadenylate polymerases (the enzymes that produce poly(A) tails with no other nucleotides in them).

Polyadenylate polymerases are not as ancient. They have separately evolved in both bacteria and eukaryotes from CCA-adding enzyme, which is the enzyme that completes the 3′ ends of tRNAs. Its catalytic domain is homologous to that of other polymerases. It is presumed that the horizontal transfer of bacterial CCA-adding enzyme to eukaryotes allowed the archaeal-like CCA-adding enzyme to switch function to a poly(A) polymerase. Some lineages, like archaea and cyanobacteria, never evolved a polyadenylate polymerase.

Polyadenylate tails are observed in several RNA viruses, including Influenza A, Coronavirus, Alfalfa mosaic virus, and Duck Hepatitis A. Some viruses, such as HIV-1 and Poliovirus, inhibit the cell's poly-A binding protein (PABPC1) in order to emphasize their own genes' expression over the host cell's.

== History ==
Poly(A)polymerase was first identified in 1960 as an enzymatic activity in extracts made from cell nuclei that could polymerise ATP, but not ADP, into polyadenine. Although identified in many types of cells, this activity had no known function until 1971, when poly(A) sequences were found in mRNAs. The only function of these sequences was thought at first to be protection of the 3′ end of the RNA from nucleases, but later the specific roles of polyadenylation in nuclear export and translation were identified. The polymerases responsible for polyadenylation were first purified and characterized in the 1960s and 1970s, but the large number of accessory proteins that control this process were discovered only in the early 1990s.

== See also ==
- SV40
