= PNPase =

PNPase can refer to:

- Polynucleotide phosphorylase, an RNA degrading protein
- Purine nucleoside phosphorylase, an enzyme involved in purine metabolism
