= Exosome component 10 =

Protein found in humans

EXOSC10
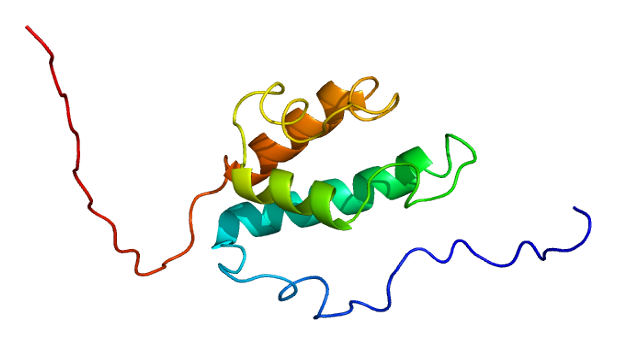

Identifiers
- Aliases: EXOSC10, PM-Scl, PM/Scl-100, PMSCL, PMSCL2, RRP6, Rrp6p, p2, p3, p4, exosome component 10
- External IDs: OMIM: 605960; MGI: 1355322; GeneCards: EXOSC10
Available structures
PDB	Ortholog search: PDBe RCSB
PDB	List of PDB id codes 2CPR, 3SAF, 3SAG, 3SAH

Gene location (Human)
Chr.	Chromosome 1 (human)
Band	1p36.22	Start	11,066,618 bp
Band	1p36.22	End	11,099,869 bp

Gene location (Mouse)
Chr.	Chromosome 4 (mouse)
Band	4|4 E2	Start	148,642,886 bp
Band	4|4 E2	End	148,666,858 bp
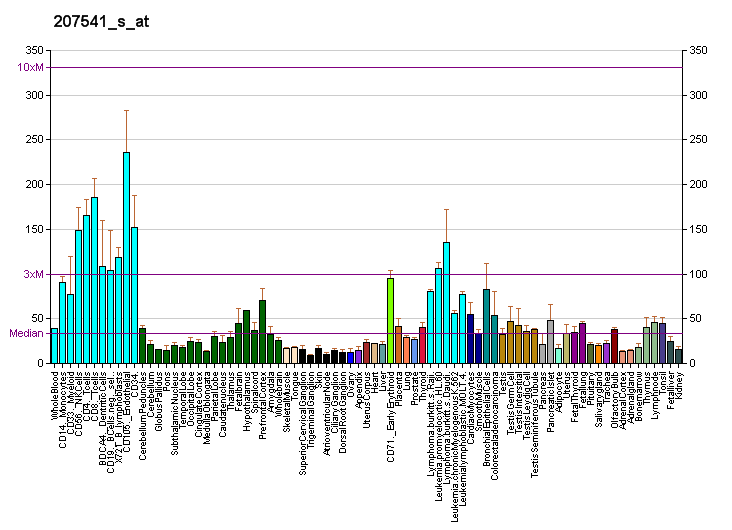
RNA expression pattern
Bgee	Human / Mouse (ortholog); Top expressed in: cerebellar hemisphere; right hemisphere of cerebellum; tibial nerve; sural nerve; Achilles tendon; left ovary; right ovary; body of uterus; canal of the cervix; right uterine tube / Top expressed in: genital tubercle; tail of embryo; seminiferous tubule; maxillary prominence; mandibular prominence; fetal liver hematopoietic progenitor cell; spermatocyte; otic placode; neural tube; otic vesicle; More reference expression data
BioGPS	More reference expression data
Gene ontology
Molecular function	nucleotide binding; exoribonuclease activity; protein binding; catalytic activity; 3'-5' exonuclease activity; nucleic acid binding; nuclease activity; exonuclease activity; hydrolase activity; RNA binding; 3'-5'-exoribonuclease activity; telomerase RNA binding; single-stranded RNA binding
Cellular component	cytoplasm; exosome (RNase complex); membrane; nuclear exosome (RNase complex); intracellular anatomical structure; nucleolus; nucleus; nucleoplasm; cytosol
Biological process	RNA processing; nuclear polyadenylation-dependent rRNA catabolic process; nucleic acid phosphodiester bond hydrolysis; CUT catabolic process; nuclear-transcribed mRNA catabolic process; nuclear mRNA surveillance; cell metabolism; maturation of 5.8S rRNA; histone mRNA catabolic process; dosage compensation by inactivation of X chromosome; nucleobase-containing compound metabolic process; rRNA processing; RNA phosphodiester bond hydrolysis, exonucleolytic; nuclear-transcribed mRNA catabolic process, nonsense-mediated decay; negative regulation of telomere maintenance via telomerase; regulation of telomerase RNA localization to Cajal body; exonucleolytic trimming to generate mature 3'-end of 5.8S rRNA from tricistronic rRNA transcript (SSU-rRNA, 5.8S rRNA, LSU-rRNA); nuclear polyadenylation-dependent snoRNA catabolic process; nuclear polyadenylation-dependent snRNA catabolic process; nuclear polyadenylation-dependent tRNA catabolic process; nuclear polyadenylation-dependent CUT catabolic process; nuclear polyadenylation-dependent antisense transcript catabolic process; polyadenylation-dependent snoRNA 3'-end processing
Sources:Amigo / QuickGO
Orthologs
Databases	NCBI: entry; OMA: entry
Species	Human	Mouse
Entrez	5394	50912
Ensembl	ENSG00000171824	ENSMUSG00000017264
UniProt	Q01780	P56960
RefSeq (mRNA)	NM_001001998; NM_002685	NM_016699; NM_001355489; NM_001355490
RefSeq (protein)	NP_001001998; NP_002676	NP_057908; NP_001342418; NP_001342419
Location (UCSC)	Chr 1: 11.07 – 11.1 Mb	Chr 4: 148.64 – 148.67 Mb
PubMed search
- Wikidata
View/Edit Human	View/Edit Mouse

Exosome component 10, also known as EXOSC10, is a human gene, the protein product of which (sometimes called PM/Scl-100) is part of the exosome complex and is an autoantigen is patients with certain autoimmune diseases, most notably scleromyositis. Mutations of the gene can cause microcephaly.
