= Overlap syndrome =

- Specialty: Rheumatology, hepatology

An overlap syndrome is a medical condition which shares features of at least two more widely recognised disorders. Examples of overlap syndromes can be found in many medical specialties such as overlapping connective tissue disorders in rheumatology, and overlapping genetic disorders in cardiology.

== Rheumatology ==
Examples of overlap syndromes in rheumatology include mixed connective tissue disease and scleromyositis. Diagnosis depends on which diseases the patient shows symptoms and has positive antibodies for in their lab serology.

In overlap syndrome, features of the following diseases are found (most common listed):

- Systemic lupus erythematosus (SLE)
- Systemic sclerosis
- Polymyositis
- Dermatomyositis
- Rheumatoid arthritis (RA)
- Sjögren's syndrome
- Eosinophilic granulomatosis with polyangiitis (EGPA)
- Autoimmune thyroiditis
- Antiphospholipid antibody syndrome

The treatment of overlapping connective tissue disorders is mainly based on the use of corticosteroids and immunosuppressants. Biologic drugs, i.e. anti-TNFα or anti-CD20 monoclonal antibodies, have been recently introduced as alternative treatments in refractory cases. There are some concerns with the use of anti-TNF agents in patients with systemic autoimmune diseases due to the risk of triggering disease exacerbations.

The term polyangiitis overlap syndrome refers to a systemic vasculitis that shares features with two or more distinct vasculitis syndromes. The most common type of polyangiitis overlap syndrome is microscopic polyangiitis (MPA), which shares features with EGPA, granulomatosis with polyangiitis and panarteritis nodosa. Sometimes polyangiitis overlap syndrome is used as a synonym for MPA.

== Gastroenterology ==
In gastroenterology, the term overlap syndrome may be used to describe autoimmune liver diseases that combine characteristic features of autoimmune hepatitis, primary biliary cirrhosis and primary sclerosing cholangitis.

== Cardiology ==
In cardiology, genetic conditions such as Brugada syndrome can share features with related disorders caused by mutations in the same gene. An overlap syndrome can be seen whereby a mutation in the SCN5A gene encoding the cardiac sodium channel causes a reduction in the peak sodium current leading to the typical ECG features of Brugada syndrome, but which simultaneously increases the sustained late sodium current leading to the ECG features of Long QT syndrome type 3. Brugada syndrome can also overlap with arrhythmogenic cardiomyopathy due to certain mutations in the plakophilin gene.

== Pulmonology ==
In pulmonology, asthma-COPD Overlap Syndrome (ACOS) is a condition in which clinical features and symptoms of both asthma and COPD are present in a person and overlap significantly.

== See also ==
- Autoimmune
- Mixed connective tissue disease
