= DIS3 =

Protein-coding gene in the species Homo sapiens

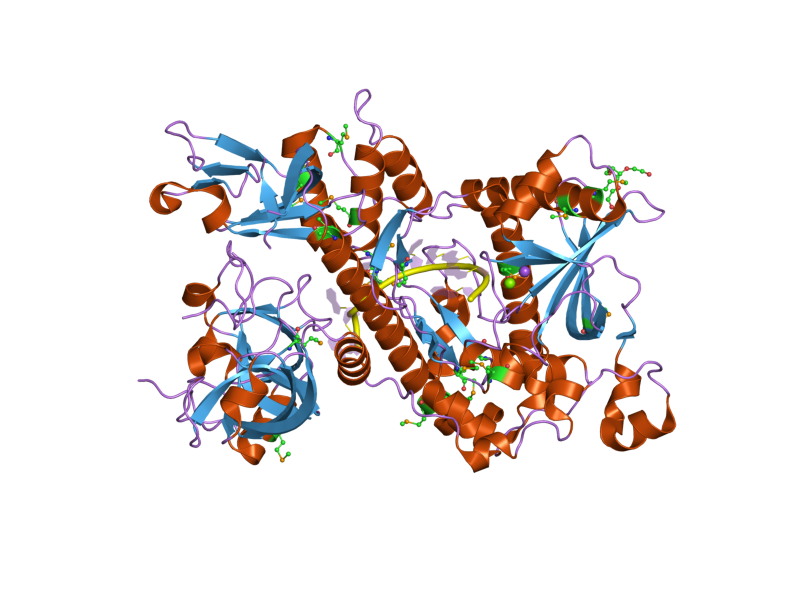

Identifiers
- Aliases: DIS3, 2810028N01Rik, EXOSC11, KIAA1008, RRP44, dis3p, DIS3 homolog, exosome endoribonuclease and 3'-5' exoribonuclease
- External IDs: OMIM: 607533; MGI: 1919912; GeneCards: DIS3

Gene location (Human)
Chr.	Chromosome 13 (human)
Band	13q21.33	Start	72,752,169 bp
Band	13q21.33	End	72,782,096 bp

Gene location (Mouse)
Chr.	Chromosome 14 (mouse)
Band	14|14 E2.2	Start	99,312,642 bp
Band	14|14 E2.2	End	99,337,206 bp
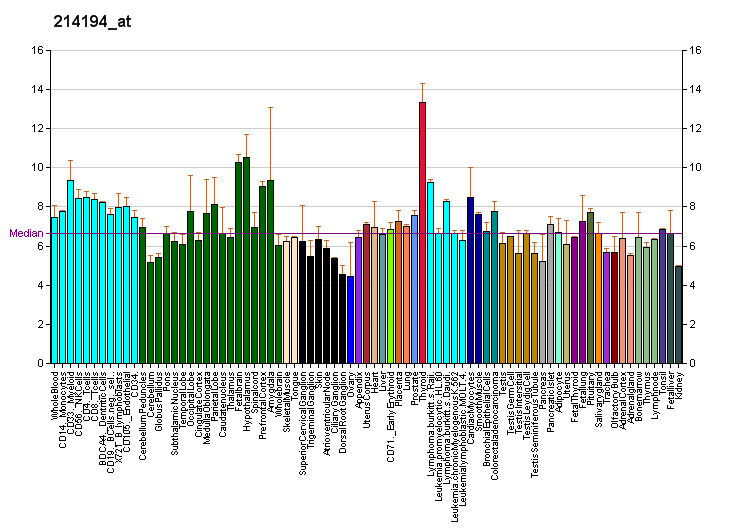

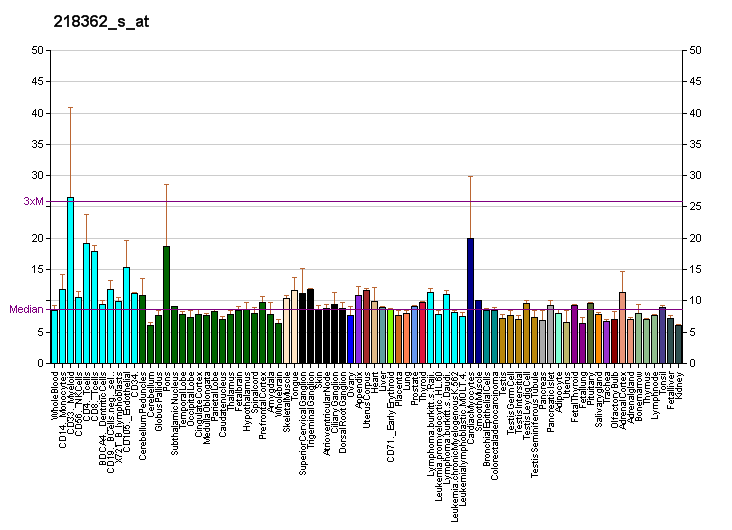
RNA expression pattern
Bgee	Human / Mouse (ortholog); Top expressed in: sperm; Achilles tendon; ventricular zone; testicle; stromal cell of endometrium; ganglionic eminence; rectum; islet of Langerhans; popliteal artery; tibial arteries / Top expressed in: primitive streak; spermatid; epiblast; tail of embryo; seminiferous tubule; somite; abdominal wall; genital tubercle; endothelial cell of lymphatic vessel; Paneth cell; More reference expression data
BioGPS	More reference expression data
Gene ontology
Molecular function	nuclease activity; hydrolase activity; guanyl-nucleotide exchange factor activity; exonuclease activity; RNA binding; protein binding; endonuclease activity; 3'-5'-exoribonuclease activity; ribonuclease activity
Cellular component	nucleolus; nucleoplasm; cytoplasm; exosome (RNase complex); nuclear exosome (RNase complex); membrane; nucleus; cytosol; cytoplasmic exosome (RNase complex)
Biological process	exonucleolytic catabolism of deadenylated mRNA; regulation of mRNA stability; CUT catabolic process; rRNA processing; rRNA catabolic process; nucleic acid phosphodiester bond hydrolysis; RNA phosphodiester bond hydrolysis, exonucleolytic; regulation of molecular function; RNA catabolic process; RNA phosphodiester bond hydrolysis
Sources:Amigo / QuickGO
Orthologs
Databases	NCBI: entry; OMA: entry
Species	Human	Mouse
Entrez	22894	72662
Ensembl	ENSG00000083520	ENSMUSG00000033166
UniProt	Q9Y2L1	Q9CSH3
RefSeq (mRNA)	NM_001128226; NM_014953; NM_001322348; NM_001322349	NM_028315; NM_001360050; NM_001360051
RefSeq (protein)	NP_001121698; NP_001309277; NP_001309278; NP_055768	NP_082591; NP_001346979; NP_001346980
Location (UCSC)	Chr 13: 72.75 – 72.78 Mb	Chr 14: 99.31 – 99.34 Mb
PubMed search
- Wikidata
View/Edit Human	View/Edit Mouse

Exosome complex exonuclease RRP44 or Dis3 is an enzyme that in humans is encoded by the DIS3 gene. Its protein product is an RNase enzyme homologous to the yeast protein Rrp44, and can be part of the exosome complex in the nucleus of eukaryotic cells.
