= Exosome component 3 =

Protein-coding gene in the species Homo sapiens

EXOSC3
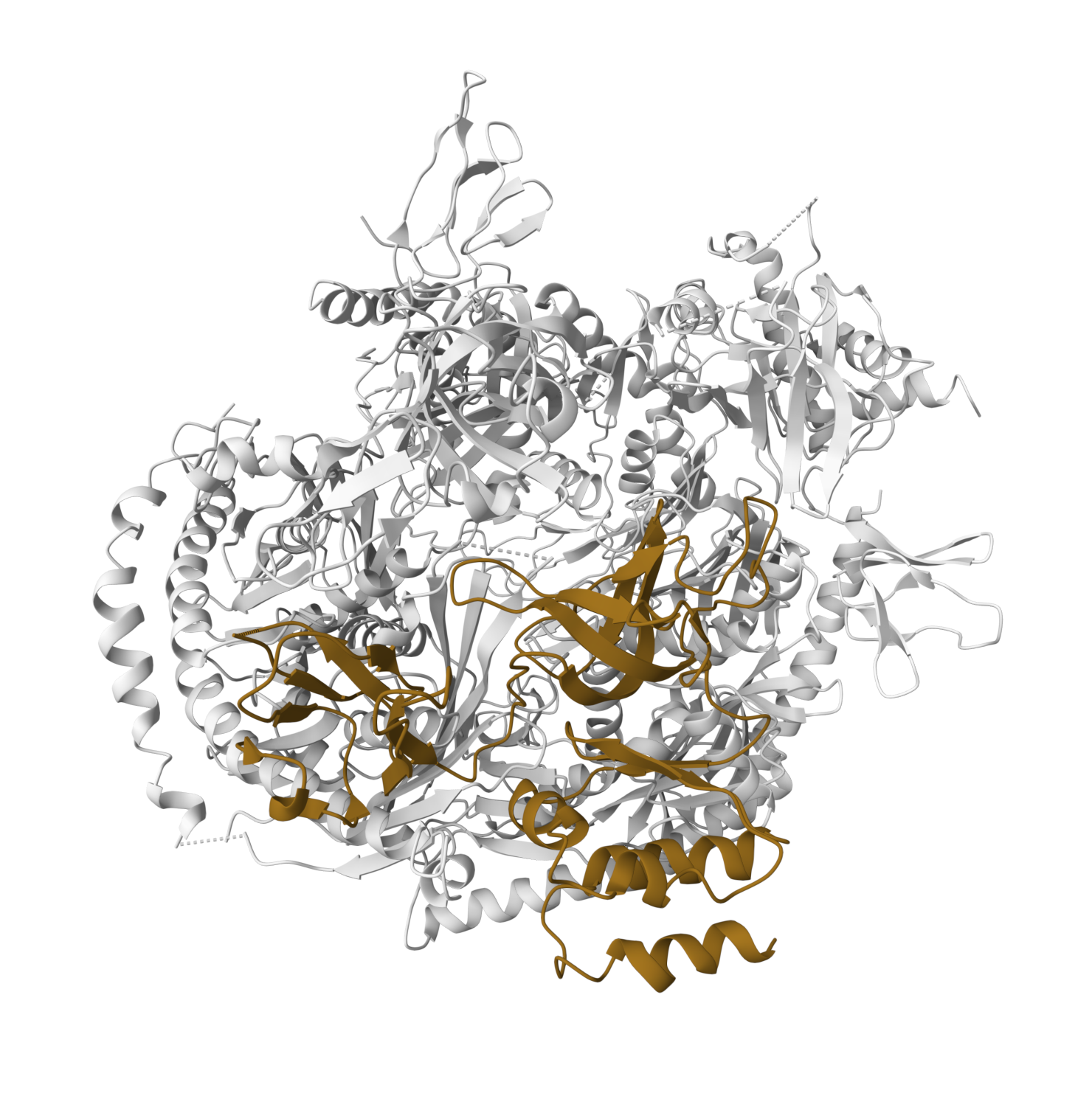

Identifiers
- Aliases: EXOSC3, PCH1B, RRP40, Rrp40p, bA3J10.7, hRrp-40, p10, CGI-102, Exosome component 3
- External IDs: OMIM: 606489; MGI: 1913612; GeneCards: EXOSC3
Available structures
PDB	Ortholog search: PDBe RCSB
PDB	List of PDB id codes 2NN6

Gene location (Human)
Chr.	Chromosome 9 (human)
Band	9p13.2	Start	37,759,234 bp
Band	9p13.2	End	37,832,117 bp

Gene location (Mouse)
Chr.	Chromosome 4 (mouse)
Band	4|4 B1	Start	45,316,613 bp
Band	4|4 B1	End	45,342,732 bp
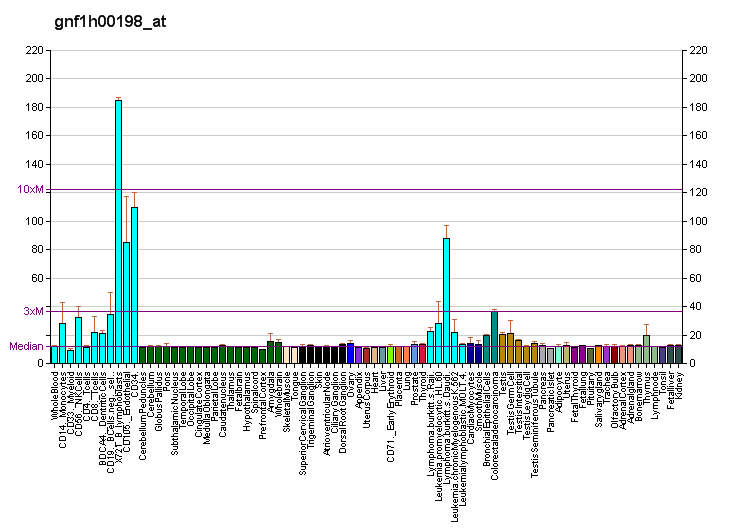
RNA expression pattern
Bgee	Human / Mouse (ortholog); Top expressed in: oocyte; secondary oocyte; tendon of biceps brachii; Achilles tendon; right testis; left testis; gonad; stromal cell of endometrium; sperm; ganglionic eminence / Top expressed in: tail of embryo; genital tubercle; embryo; embryo; yolk sac; epiblast; zygote; spermatid; ventricular zone; interventricular septum; More reference expression data
BioGPS	More reference expression data
Gene ontology
Molecular function	3'-5'-exoribonuclease activity; exoribonuclease activity; protein binding; RNA binding
Cellular component	cytosol; nuclear exosome (RNase complex); cytoplasmic exosome (RNase complex); nucleus; cytoplasm; exosome (RNase complex); nucleolus; nucleoplasm
Biological process	nuclear polyadenylation-dependent tRNA catabolic process; exonucleolytic trimming to generate mature 3'-end of 5.8S rRNA from tricistronic rRNA transcript (SSU-rRNA, 5.8S rRNA, LSU-rRNA); regulation of mRNA stability; polyadenylation-dependent snoRNA 3'-end processing; DNA deamination; CUT catabolic process; nuclear polyadenylation-dependent rRNA catabolic process; positive regulation of isotype switching; isotype switching; nuclear-transcribed mRNA catabolic process, exonucleolytic, 3'-5'; U4 snRNA 3'-end processing; rRNA processing; exonucleolytic catabolism of deadenylated mRNA
Sources:Amigo / QuickGO
Orthologs
Databases	NCBI: entry; OMA: entry
Species	Human	Mouse
Entrez	51010	66362
Ensembl	ENSG00000107371	ENSMUSG00000028322
UniProt	Q9NQT5	Q7TQK4
RefSeq (mRNA)	NM_016042; NM_001002269	NM_025513; NM_001362788
RefSeq (protein)	NP_001002269; NP_057126	NP_079789; NP_001349717
Location (UCSC)	Chr 9: 37.76 – 37.83 Mb	Chr 4: 45.32 – 45.34 Mb
PubMed search
- Wikidata
View/Edit Human	View/Edit Mouse

Exosome component 3, also known as EXOSC3, is a human gene, which is part of the exosome complex.

== Clinical significance ==
Mutations in EXOSC3 cause pontocerebellar hypoplasia and spinal motor neuron degeneration.
