= Cryptic unstable transcript =

Cryptic unstable transcripts (CUTs) are a subset of non-coding RNAs (ncRNAs) that are produced from intergenic and intragenic regions. CUTs were first observed in S. cerevisiae yeast models and are found in most eukaryotes. Some basic characteristics of CUTs include a length of around 200–800 base pairs, a 5′ cap, poly-adenylated tail, and rapid degradation due to the combined activity of poly-adenylating polymerases and exosome complexes. CUT transcription occurs through RNA Polymerase II and initiates from nucleosome-depleted regions, often in an antisense orientation. To date, CUTs have a relatively uncharacterized function but have been implicated in a number of putative gene regulation and silencing pathways. Thousands of loci leading to the generation of CUTs have been described in the yeast genome. Additionally, stable uncharacterized transcripts, or SUTs, have also been detected in cells and bear many similarities to CUTs but are not degraded through the same pathways.

== Discovery and characterization ==
Regions of non-coding RNA were mapped in several early experiments examining S. cerevisiae using a tiling array approach, which indicated that a large amount of transcriptional activity could be attributed to the intergenic region of the genome. These detected transcripts are not readily observed in the mRNA population because they are rapidly targeted for degradation in both the nucleus and cytoplasm. However, CUTs can be examined in yeast mutants with compromised exosome enzyme capability, which allows for transcripts to accumulate and enables their study and characterization.

In 2009, the Steinmetz and Jacquier laboratories performed a series of high-resolution transcriptome maps, further characterizing the widespread distribution and location of non-coding transcripts within eukaryotes. CUTs were found to comprise around 13% of all mapped transcripts.

== Degradation pathways ==
As CUTs cannot be observed at appreciable levels in wild-type S. cerevisiae, a large component of their early study has focused on their degradation. To date, two main pathways have been identified: the recruitment of a degrading exosome via the Nrd1-Nab3-Sen1 protein complex assisted by TRAMP, and termination due to the poly-adenylating capability of the Pap1p complex. In addition to these two main pathways, 5' processing enzymes such as Xrn1 have also been shown to participate in CUT degradation. Many of these findings were generated by observing Δrrp6 cells, a knock-out mutant for the exosome enzyme which has heightened levels of cryptic transcripts mapped to transgenic regions. In fact, deletion of the RRP6 subunit has served as one of the earliest and most frequently used methods for generating high concentrations of CUTs.

=== The Nrd1-Nab3-Sen1 and TRAMP pathway ===
Transcription of CUTs is terminated by the Nrd1-Nab3-Sen1 complex. Collectively, Nrd1 and Nab3 are proteins which bind to specific sequences (GUAA/G and UCUUG respectively) of RNA and Sen1 is helicase. Nrd1-Nab3-Sen1 recruit the nuclear exosome which contains the degrading RRP6 subunit. Assisting in the Nrd1-Nab3-Sen1 pathway as a co-factor is the TRAMP complex, which is responsible for poly-adenylating transcripts and marking them for degradation. The TRAMP complex was discovered in Δrrp6 cells, when a certain population of poly-adenylated CUTs were attributed to the activity of a novel yeast polymerase, Trf4p. Trf4p was found to associate in a Trf4p/trf5p-Air1p/Air2p-Mtr4 complex (a collective complex referred to as TRAMP: Trf-Air-Mtr4 Polyadenylation complex) which serves as an alternative Poly(A) polymerase to Pap1p within S. Cerevisiae.

=== Role of Xrn1 ===
Cytoplasmic decay of unstable transcripts can also be attributed to the activity of decapping enzymes and Xrn1. Transcripts that enter the cytoplasm can be targeted by the Dcp1-Dcp2 complex which removes the 5′ cap, allowing for the 5′ to 3′ exoribonuclease Xrn1 to degrade the transcript completely. The role of Dcp1-Dcp2 and Xrn1 in cytoplasmic decay has also been found to participate in the regulation of SUT levels.

== Relation with bidirectional promoters ==
The transcription start sites of CUTs are located within nucleosome free, non-overlapping transcript pairs. These nucleosome free regions of the genome have been frequently correlated with the promoter regions of open reading frames and mRNA transcripts, indicating that a portion of CUTs are located within bidirectional promoters. Additionally, serial analysis of gene expression has demonstrated that the location of CUT 3' ends can be found in close proximity to the start features of ORFs in both sense and antisense configurations, indicating that the end of CUT sequences lay within the 5' promoter region of expressed proteins.

Sense CUTs have been largely found in promoters associated with glucose catabolism genes, while antisense CUTs have no specific associations and are found dispersed in promoters across the entire genome.

== SUTs ==
Stable uncharacterized transcripts or stable unannotated transcripts (SUTs) share certain similar characteristics to CUTs – they can originate from the intergenic region, are non-coding transcripts, and undergo 5' to 3' cytoplasmic degradation. Like CUTs, SUT transcription start sites are also found at nucleosome free regions and are associated with the promoters of protein coding genes. However, SUTs can be observed in both Δrrp6 mutants and wild-type cells, indicating they are only partially degraded by the exosome and are able to escape the Nrd1-Nab3-Sen1 pathway. SUTs are primarily degraded instead by the combined activity of the decapping enzymes Dcp1, Dcp2 and the cytoplasmic exonuclease Xrn1.

One class of SUTs has been found to participate in the trans-silencing of a retrotransposon.

== Interaction with histones ==
=== CUT repression ===
Within yeast models, it has been observed that the histone methyltransferase Set2 is critical for maintaining proper methylation at histone 3 lysine 36 (H3K36). Loss of Set2 function results in loss of H3K36 methylation and over-acetylation on histone H4, allowing for the expression of several short cryptic transcripts from the genes STE11 and FLO8. In this case, the loss of Set2 allows for the expression of exon-derived CUTs as opposed to intergenic-derived transcripts, showing the role that histones play in controlling intragenic-derived CUTs.

In the absence of the transcription elongation factors Spt6 and Spt16, nucleosomes distribute incorrectly across DNA, allowing for RNA polymerase II to access cryptic polymerase sites and erroneously transcribe CUTs. Spt6 is responsible for restoring normal chromatin structure following transcription from RNA polymerase II, and yeast cells with compromised Spt6 function have been found to produce an increased number of CUTs. For instance, RNA polymerase II has been observed to bind incorrectly to the interior initiation region of the FLO8 gene in spt6 mutants, allowing for cryptic transcription to occur due to an erroneous nucleosome distribution.

=== Histone eviction/recruitment through CUTs ===
A cryptic transcript located at the promoter of PHO5 that is detectable in Δrrp6 mutants is responsible for increasing the speed of promoter remodeling. Knock-out mutants without the ability to transcribe the CUT have about half the rate of histone eviction from the PHO5 promoter compared to wild-type cells, implying that the CUT is responsible for mediating the accessibility of the PHO5 promoter to RNA Polymerase II.

It has also been observed in S. cerevisiae that Δrrp6 and Δtrf4 mutants have repressed transcription of the gene PHO84. Δrrp6 and Δtrf4 cells have stabilized levels of PHO84 antisense transcripts, which serve to recruit the Hda1/2/3 histone deacetylase complex to the PHO84 gene, effectively silencing transcription and expression through histone deacetylation. In Δrrp6 cells, Hda1 associates with the promoter or coding regions of PHO84 up to five times more often than in wild-type counterparts. Additionally, histone deacetylation activity occurs specifically at the region of PHO84 and Hda1 overlap on histone 3 lysine 18 (H3K18), indicating that the CUT is responsible for recruiting the histone deacetylase. Along with antisense TY1 transcripts, PHO84 antisense transcripts can serve a potential regulatory function in S. Cerevisiae.

== PROMPTs ==
Promoter upstream transcripts (PROMPTs) are found around 1–1.5 kb upstream of human transcription start sites in nongenic regions. Like CUTs, PROMPTs are a form of noncoding RNAs that become detectable in the absence of a degrading exosome enzyme. PROMPTs were first identified in siRNA-silenced hRrp40 human cells, where hRrp40 serves as a core subunit of the human exoribonucleolytic exosome. PROMPT-encoding regions have been found to produce sense and antisense transcripts, both of which are equally targeted by the exosome.

In terms of function, ncRNAs with putative regulatory functions have been located to potential PROMPT regions. As a large portion of the human genome has been shown to be transcribed, the existence of PROMPTs helps explain a portion of the non-coding transcripts that are still generated.

== Function ==
Although an endogenous RNA interference pathway does not exist within S. cerevisiae, CUTs and SUTs may serve a comparable function. There has been an observed similarity between the suppression of the transposable element TY1 in yeast and small interfering RNA activity within plants. In XRN1 mutants, TY1 transcripts decrease in number and TY1 antisense transcripts increase. These antisense TY1 transcripts reduce TY1 transposition activity in a trans manner and mitigates its expression, indicating a potential role for CUTs and SUTs in epigenetics. Similarly, expression of the ncRNA SRG1 in S. Cerevisiae represses the transcriptional activity of the SER3 phosphoglycerate dehydrogenase gene.

The rapidly degraded antisense transcripts of the gene PHO84 have also been shown to recruit the histone deacetylase Hda1 to the PHO84 gene, effectively suppressing PHO84 expression.

== See also ==
- Non-coding RNA
