= RNase E 5′ UTR element =

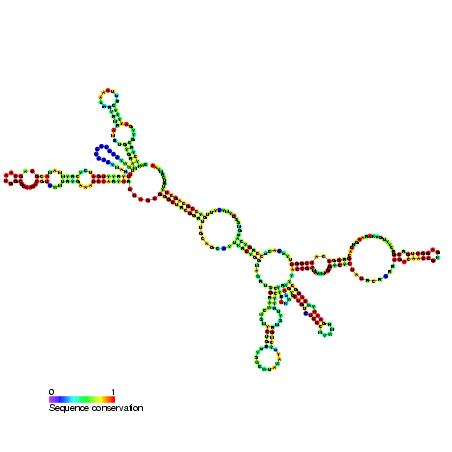
- Predicted secondary structure and sequence conservation of rne5

Identifiers
- Symbol: rne5
- Rfam: RF00040

Other data
- RNA type: Cis-reg
- Domain(s): Bacteria
- SO: SO:0000204
- PDB structures: PDBe

In molecular biology, the RNase E 5′ UTR element is a cis-acting element located in the 5′ UTR of ribonuclease (RNase) E messenger RNA (mRNA).

RNase E is a key regulatory enzyme in the pathway of mRNA degradation in Escherichia coli. It is able to auto-regulate the degradation of its own mRNA in response to changes in RNase E activity. This rne 5′ UTR element acts as a sensor of cellular RNase E concentration enabling tight regulation of RNase E concentration and synthesis.

== See also ==
- Degradosome
