= NRDE2 =

Protein-coding gene in the species Homo sapiens

Identifiers
- Aliases: NRDE2, C14orf102, NRDE-2, necessary for RNA interference, domain containing
- External IDs: MGI: 2670969; GeneCards: NRDE2

Gene location (Human)
Chr.	Chromosome 14 (human)
Band	14q32.11	Start	90,267,860 bp
Band	14q32.11	End	90,331,969 bp

Gene location (Mouse)
Chr.	Chromosome 12 (mouse)
Band	12|12 E	Start	100,091,711 bp
Band	12|12 E	End	100,125,912 bp
RNA expression pattern
Bgee	Human / Mouse (ortholog); Top expressed in: sural nerve; testicle; bone marrow cell; gonad; Achilles tendon; right lobe of liver; gastrocnemius muscle; muscle of thigh; mucosa of transverse colon; islet of Langerhans / Top expressed in: interventricular septum; Gonadal ridge; Rostral migratory stream; primitive streak; otic vesicle; renal corpuscle; granulocyte; epiblast; hair follicle; blood; More reference expression data
BioGPS	n/a
Gene ontology
Molecular function	molecular function
Cellular component	catalytic step 2 spliceosome; cellular component
Biological process	heterochromatin assembly by small RNA; RNA interference; biological process
Sources:Amigo / QuickGO
Orthologs
Databases	NCBI: entry; OMA: entry
Species	Human	Mouse
Entrez	55051	217827
Ensembl	ENSG00000119720	ENSMUSG00000021179
UniProt	Q9H7Z3	Q80XC6
RefSeq (mRNA)	NM_017970; NM_199043	NM_001290303; NM_183155; NM_001377383
RefSeq (protein)	NP_060440	NP_001277232; NP_898978; NP_001364312
Location (UCSC)	Chr 14: 90.27 – 90.33 Mb	Chr 12: 100.09 – 100.13 Mb
PubMed search
- Wikidata
View/Edit Human	View/Edit Mouse

Nuclear exosome regulator NRDE2 is a protein which in humans is encoded by the gene NRDE2 (previously C14orf102). The protein NRDE2 functions as an RNA regulator through its interaction with MTREX. In particular, it regulates RNA degradation, and the transport of RNA out of the nucleus.

== Expression ==
According to EST profiles, C14orf102 is most highly expressed in the esophagus (98 TPM) and trachea (76), and is further expressed in multiple different tissues. However, the AceView summary suggests that this gene is expressed most highly in the brain, followed by decreased expression in 81 separate tissues. This is inferred in the reconstruction of the mRNA sequence, as well as exon sequencing, in that the majority of cDNA clones used for each procedure were found in the brain. This is consistent with GenBank record, which indicates that the cDNA clone was also isolated from brain tissue. The general expression of the gene is high, being 1.8 times that of average gene expression.

== Protein ==
The protein contains five HAT (histone acetyltransferase) domains, a coiled coil domain, a domain of unknown function, a lysine-rich region, and a poly-lysine and serine region. Further post-translational modifications include phosphorylation and mono-methylation sites. Because the protein is considered to be a part of a family of Up-frameshift proteins, it is expected to function in protein binding and to be located in the cytoplasm. Certain UPF proteins have been found to play a central role in the nonsense-mediated mRNA decay (NMD) pathway, which is responsible for identifying and degrading mRNA sequences that contain premature termination codons (PTCs) – sequences that encode truncated amino acid sequences.

== Interaction ==
C14orf102 interacts with RNPS1, a gene encoding a protein that is known to be directly involved in nuclear export and surveillance of mRNA. Surveillance by the RNPS1 protein initiates NMD after identification of exported, PTC-containing mRNA. Because UPF0614 is expected to be located in the cytoplasm and function in protein binding, this interaction supports the potential role of UPF0614 in the NMD pathway.
