= DIS3L =

Protein-coding gene in the species Homo sapiens

Identifiers
- Aliases: DIS3L, DIS3L1, DIS3 like exosome 3'-5' exoribonuclease
- External IDs: OMIM: 614183; MGI: 2143272; GeneCards: DIS3L
Enzyme activity
| EC # | BRENDA | ExPASy | KEGG | MetaCyc |
|---|---|---|---|---|
| 3.1.13.1 | ↗ | ↗ | ↗ | ↗ |

Gene location (Human)
| Chr. | Chromosome 15 (human) |
| Band | 15q22.31 | Start | 66,293,217 bp |
| Band | 15q22.31 | End | 66,333,898 bp |

Gene location (Mouse)
| Chr. | Chromosome 9 (mouse) |
| Band | 9|9 C | Start | 64,214,038 bp |
| Band | 9|9 C | End | 64,248,570 bp |
RNA expression pattern
| Bgee | Human / Mouse (ortholog); Top expressed in: myocardium of left ventricle; corpus callosum; tibialis anterior muscle; deltoid muscle; vastus lateralis muscle; Skeletal muscle tissue of biceps brachii; muscle of thigh; Achilles tendon; skin of arm; gonad / Top expressed in: spermatocyte; spermatid; secondary oocyte; seminiferous tubule; primary oocyte; muscle of thigh; zygote; interventricular septum; right kidney; hand; More reference expression data |
| BioGPS | n/a |
Gene ontology
| Molecular function | enzyme binding; nuclease activity; exonuclease activity; protein binding; hydrolase activity; RNA binding; 3'-5'-exoribonuclease activity; endonuclease activity; ribonuclease activity |
| Cellular component | cytoplasmic exosome (RNase complex); centrosome; plasma membrane; exosome (RNase complex); cytoplasm; cytosol; nuclear exosome (RNase complex) |
| Biological process | rRNA processing; RNA phosphodiester bond hydrolysis, exonucleolytic; rRNA catabolic process; RNA catabolic process |
Sources:Amigo / QuickGO
Orthologs
| Databases | NCBI: entry; OMA: entry |
| Species | Human | Mouse |
| Entrez | 115752 | 213550 |
| Ensembl | ENSG00000166938 | ENSMUSG00000032396 |
| UniProt | Q8TF46 | Q8C0S1 |
| RefSeq (mRNA) | NM_001143688; NM_133375; NM_001323936; NM_001323937; NM_001323938 NM_001323939; NM_001323940; NM_001323941; NM_001323943; NM_001323944; NM_001323945; NM_001323946; NM_001323948 | NM_001001295; NM_001177784; NM_172519 |
| RefSeq (protein) | NP_001137160; NP_001310865; NP_001310866; NP_001310867; NP_001310868 NP_001310869; NP_001310870; NP_001310872; NP_001310873; NP_001310874; NP_001310875; NP_001310877; NP_588616 | NP_001001295; NP_001171255; NP_766107 |
| Location (UCSC) | Chr 15: 66.29 – 66.33 Mb | Chr 9: 64.21 – 64.25 Mb |
| PubMed search |
- Wikidata
| View/Edit Human | View/Edit Mouse |

DIS3-like exonuclease 1 (Dis3L1 or Dis3L) is an enzyme that in humans is encoded by the DIS3L gene. Its protein product is an RNase enzyme homologous to the yeast protein Rrp44, and can be part of the exosome complex in the cytoplasm of eukaryotic cells.
