= Exosome RNA helicase MTR4 =

Protein-coding gene in the species Homo sapiens

MTREX

Identifiers
- Aliases: MTREX, Dob1, KIAA0052, Mtr4, fSAP118, Ski2 like RNA helicase 2, Mtr4 exosome RNA helicase, SKIV2L2
- External IDs: OMIM: 618122; MGI: 1919448; GeneCards: MTREX
Enzyme activity
EC #	BRENDA	ExPASy	KEGG	MetaCyc
3.6.4.13	↗	↗	↗	↗

Gene location (Human)
Chr.	Chromosome 5 (human)
Band	5q11.2	Start	55,307,989 bp
Band	5q11.2	End	55,425,579 bp

Gene location (Mouse)
Chr.	Chromosome 13 (mouse)
Band	13|13 D2.2	Start	113,003,952 bp
Band	13|13 D2.2	End	113,063,932 bp
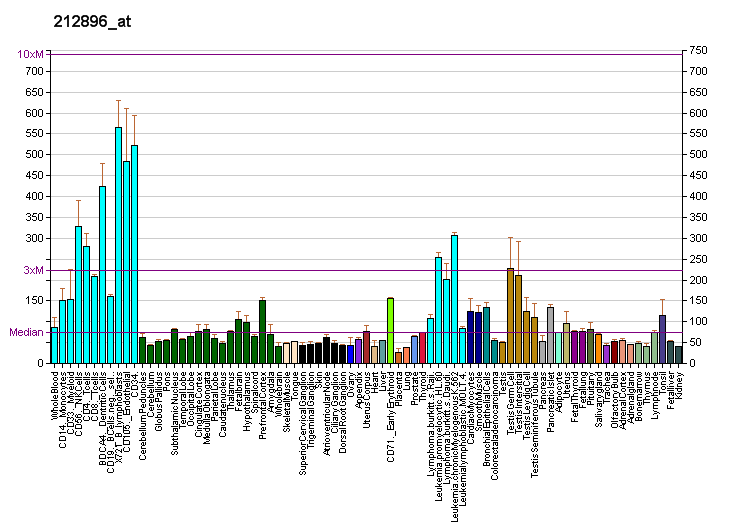
RNA expression pattern
Bgee	Human / Mouse (ortholog); Top expressed in: Achilles tendon; sural nerve; gonad; epithelium of colon; ventricular zone; testicle; ganglionic eminence; jejunal mucosa; Skeletal muscle tissue of rectus abdominis; islet of Langerhans / Top expressed in: primitive streak; genital tubercle; masseter muscle; ureter; otic vesicle; tail of embryo; Paneth cell; otic placode; facial motor nucleus; saccule; More reference expression data
BioGPS	More reference expression data
Gene ontology
Molecular function	RNA helicase activity; nucleotide binding; protein binding; ATP binding; hydrolase activity; helicase activity; nucleic acid binding; RNA binding
Cellular component	catalytic step 2 spliceosome; spliceosomal complex; nucleolus; exosome (RNase complex); nucleus; nucleoplasm; nuclear exosome (RNase complex); TRAMP complex
Biological process	mRNA processing; maturation of 5.8S rRNA; RNA splicing; rRNA processing; mRNA splicing, via spliceosome; RNA catabolic process
Sources:Amigo / QuickGO
Orthologs
Databases	NCBI: entry; OMA: entry
Species	Human	Mouse
Entrez	23517	72198
Ensembl	ENSG00000039123	ENSMUSG00000016018
UniProt	P42285	Q9CZU3
RefSeq (mRNA)	NM_015360	NM_028151
RefSeq (protein)	NP_056175	NP_082427
Location (UCSC)	Chr 5: 55.31 – 55.43 Mb	Chr 13: 113 – 113.06 Mb
PubMed search
- Wikidata
View/Edit Human	View/Edit Mouse

Exosome RNA helicase MTR4 is an enzyme that in humans is encoded by the MTREX gene (previously SKIV2L2). As an RNA helicase, the protein MTR4 participates in unwinding RNA, and is part of multiple protein complex, including TRAMP-like, NEXT, and PAXT. MTR4 is inhibited by NRDE2.
