= RNase PH =

Type of enzyme

Ribonuclease PH
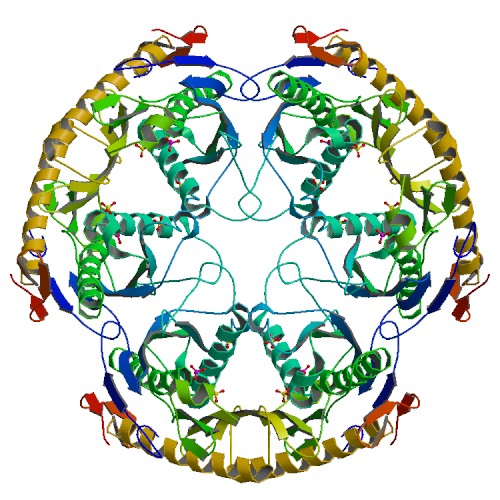
- Structure of the RNase PH hexamer

Identifiers
- Symbol: RNASEPH

Other data
- EC number: 2.7.7.56

RNase PH is a tRNA nucleotidyltransferase, present in archaea and bacteria, that is involved in tRNA processing. Contrary to hydrolytic enzymes, it is a phosphorolytic enzyme, meaning that it uses inorganic phosphate as a reactant to cleave nucleotide-nucleotide bonds, releasing diphosphate nucleotides. The active structure of the proteins is a homohexameric complex, consisting of three ribonuclease (RNase) PH dimers. RNase PH has homologues in many other organisms, which are referred to as RNase PH-like proteins. The part of another larger protein with a domain that is very similar to RNase PH is called an RNase PH domain (RPD).

== See also ==
Two highly related exoribonuclease complexes:

- Polynucleotide phosphorylase
- Exosome complex
