= TRNA nucleotidyltransferase =

tRNA nucleotidyltransferase
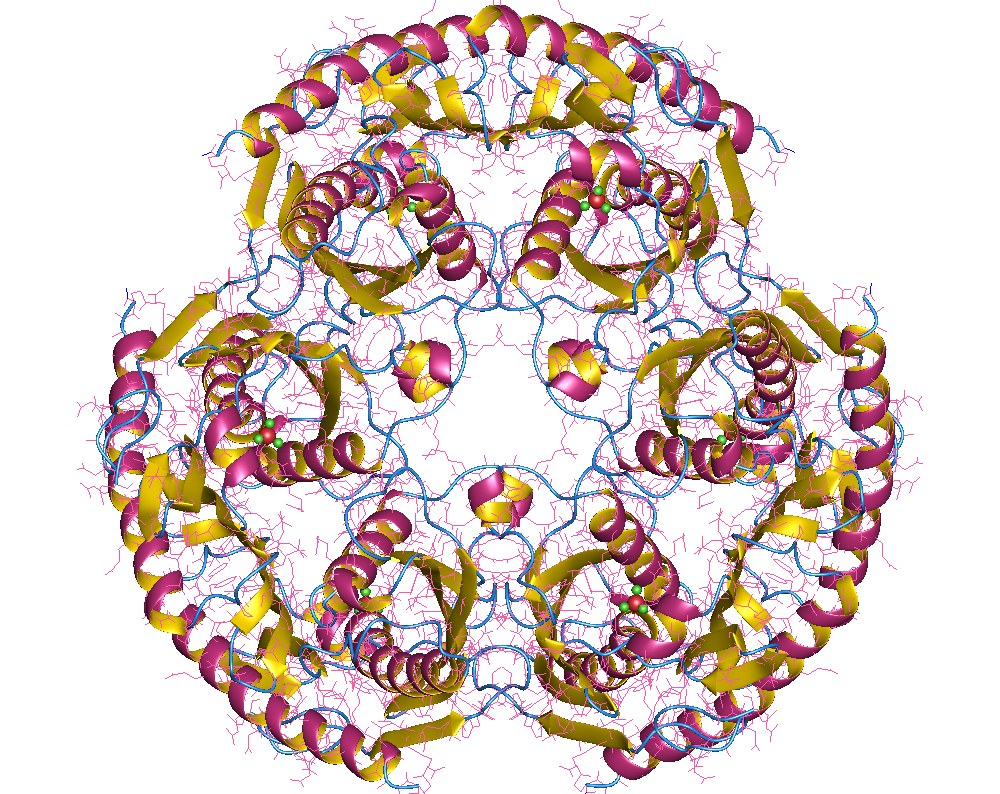
- RNase PH hexamer, Pseudomonas aeruginosa

Identifiers
- EC no.: 2.7.7.56
- CAS no.: 116412-36-3

Databases
- IntEnz: IntEnz view
- BRENDA: BRENDA entry
- ExPASy: NiceZyme view
- KEGG: KEGG entry
- MetaCyc: metabolic pathway
- PRIAM: profile
- PDB structures: RCSB PDB PDBe PDBsum
- Gene Ontology: AmiGO / QuickGO
Search
- PMC: articles
- PubMed: articles
- NCBI: proteins

In enzymology, a tRNA nucleotidyltransferase (EC 2.7.7.56) is an enzyme that catalyzes the chemical reaction

tRNA_{n+1} + phosphate $\rightleftharpoons$ tRNA_{n} + a nucleoside diphosphate

where tRNA-N is a product of transcription, and tRNA Nucleotidyltransferase catalyzes this cytidine-cytidine-adenosine (CCA) addition to form the tRNA-NCCA product.

== Function ==
Protein synthesis takes place in cytosolic ribosomes, mitochondria (mitoribosomes), and in plants, the plastids (chloroplast ribosomes). Each of these compartments requires a complete set of functional tRNAs to carry out protein synthesis. The production of mature tRNAs requires processing and modification steps such as the addition of a 3’-terminal cytidine-cytidine-adenosine (CCA). Since no plant tRNA genes encode this particular sequence, a tRNA nucleotidyltransferase must add this sequence post-transcriptionally and therefore is present in all three compartments.

In eukaryotes, multiple forms of tRNA nucleotidyltransferases are synthesized from a single gene and are distributed to different subcellular compartments in the cell. There are multiple in-frame start codons which allow for the production of variant forms of the enzyme containing different targeting information predominantly found in the N-terminal sequence of the protein. In vivo experiments show that the N-terminal sequences are used as transit peptides for import into the mitochondria and plastids. Comparison studies using available tRNA nucleotidyltransferase sequences have identified a single gene coding for this enzyme in plants. Complementation studies in yeast using cDNA derived from Arabidopsis thaliana or Lupinus albus genes demonstrate the biological activity of these enzymes. The enzyme has also been shown to repair damaged or incomplete CCA sequences in yeast.

This enzyme belongs to the family of transferases, specifically those transferring phosphorus-containing nucleotide groups (nucleotidyltransferases).
