= Degradosome =

The degradosome is a multiprotein complex present in most bacteria that is involved in the processing of ribosomal RNA and the degradation of messenger RNA and is regulated by Non-coding RNA. It contains the proteins RNA helicase B, RNase E and Polynucleotide phosphorylase.

The store of cellular RNA in the cells is constantly fluctuating. For example, in Escherichia coli, Messenger RNA's life expectancy is between 2 and 25 minutes, in other bacteria it might last longer. Even in resting cells, RNA is degraded in a steady state, and the nucleotide products of this process are later reused for fresh rounds of nucleic acid synthesis. RNA turnover is very important for gene regulation and quality control.

All organisms have various tools for RNA degradation, for instance ribonucleases, helicases, 3'-end nucleotidyltransferases (which add tails to transcripts), 5'-end capping and decapping enzymes and assorted RNA-binding proteins that help to model RNA for presentation as substrate or for recognition. Frequently, these proteins associate into stable complexes in which their activities are coordinate or cooperative. Many of these RNA metabolism proteins are represented in the components of the multi-enzyme RNA degradosome of Escherichia coli, which is constituted by four basic components: the hydrolytic endo-ribonuclease RNase E, the phosphorolytic exo-ribonuclease PNPase, the ATP-dependent RNA helicase (RhIB) and a glycolytic enzyme enolase.

The RNA degradosome was discovered in two different laboratories while they were working on the purification and characterization of E. coli, RNase E and the factors that could have an influence on the activity of the RNA-degrading enzymes, concretely, PNPase. It was found while two of its major compounds were being studied.

== Structure ==
The composition of this multienzyme may vary depending on the organism. The multiprotein complex RNA degradosome in E. coli consists of 4 canonical components:

- RNase E: a large hydrolytic endo-ribonuclease that can be divided into the N-terminal half of RNase E, that contains the catalytic domain and is the place where the nucleotical activity resides; and the C-terminal half, which is a large chain unstructured protein without a known function that provides the scaffold needed for assembling the degradosome. This region is very flexible, which makes it easier for the components of degradosome to interact. In E. coli, RNase E is located in the cytoplasmatic membrane and can be observed by fluorescence microscopy. Its structure is conformed by 1061 amino acids and it has a molecular mass of 118 kDa.
- PNPase: a phosphorolytic exo-ribonuclease that degrades RNA. Its chain has 421 amino acids and its molecular mass is 47 kDa.
- Enolase: a glycolytic enzyme enolase formed by 432 amino acids, so its molecular mass is 46 kDa.
- RNA helicase (RhlB): a big family of enzymes, this type has 711 amino acids and it weighs 77kDa. The identification of this DEAD-box protein (this type of proteins are involved in various metabolic processes that usually implicate RNAs) in the degradosome of E. coli was one of the first indicators that RNA helicases could possibly take part in the degradation of mRNA.

There are some alternate forms of the RNA degradosome with different proteins that have been reported. Supplementary alternate degradosome components are PcnB (poly A polymerase) and the RNA helicases RhlE and SrmB. Other alternate components during cold shock include RNA helicase CsdA. Additional alternate degradosome components during stationary phase include Rnr (RNase R) and the putative RNA helicase HrpA. Ppk (polyphosphate kinase) is another constituent that has been reported to be part of the complex, the same as RNA chaperone Hfq, PAP (prostatic acid phosphatase), other kinds of chaperones and ribosomal proteins. These have been found in cell-extracted degradosome preparations from E. coli.

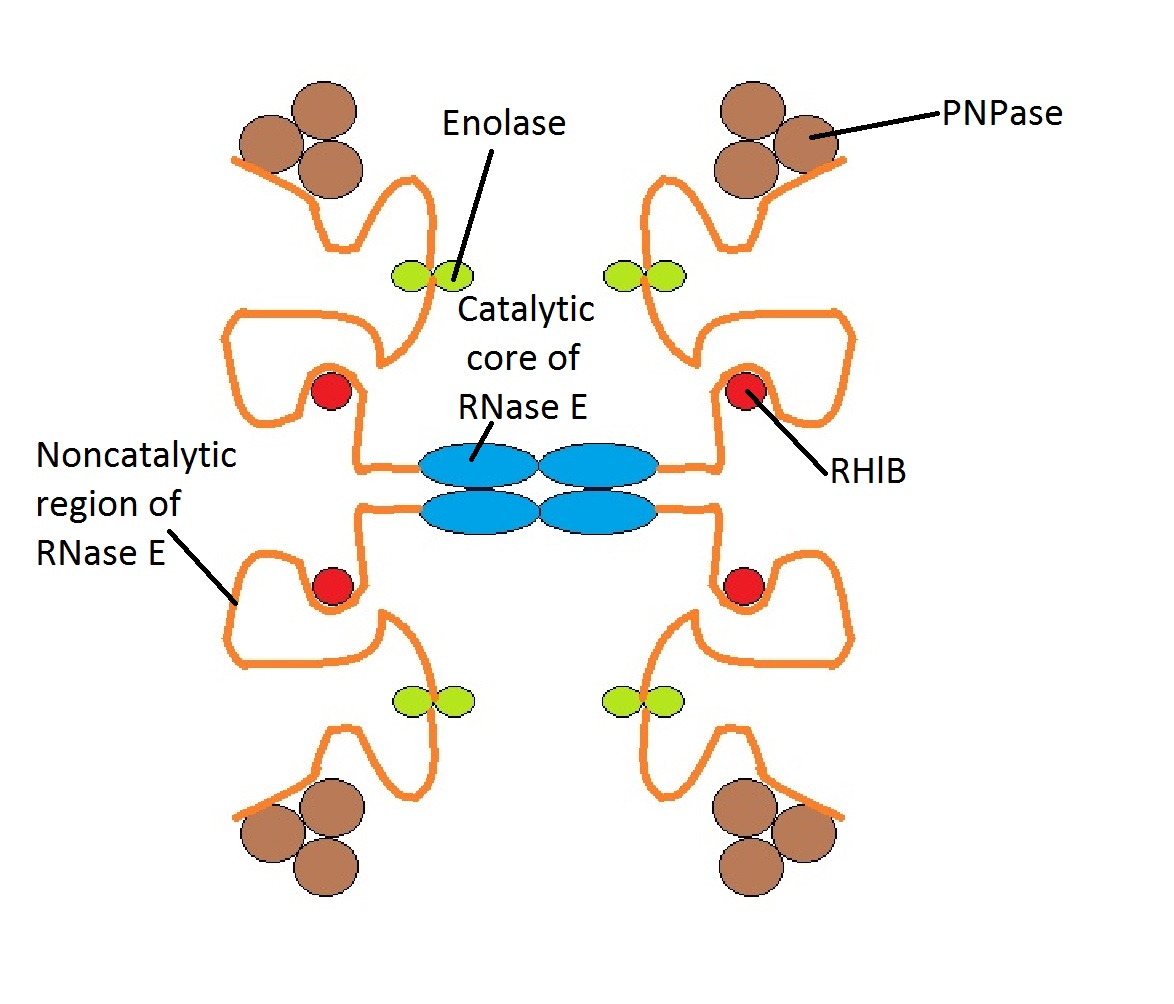
This would represent the basic structure of RNA Degradosome. The structure has been drawn symmetrically, however, it is a dynamic structure so the noncatalytic region of RNase E would form a random coil, and each of these coils would act independently from the other ones.

The structure of RNA Degradosome is not as rigid as it seems to be in the picture because this one is only a model to understand how it works. The RNA degradosome's structure is dynamic and each component interacts with the components that are close to it. So the structure is like a molecular domain where RNA can interact as a substrate with each of the components and when this happens, it is really difficult for RNA to escape from the complex.

== Functions ==
The RNA degradosome is a huge multi-enzyme association that is involved in RNA metabolism and post-transcriptional control of gene expression in numerous bacteria such as Escherichia coli and Pseudoalteromonas haloplanktis. The multi-protein complex also serves as a machine for processing structured RNA precursors in the course of their maturation.

RNA helicase is considered to help in the process of degradation to develop the double helix structure in RNA stem-loops. Occasionally, copurification of rRNA with degradosome is appreciated, which suggests that the complex may take part in rRNA and mRNA degradation. There is very little clear information about the role of degradosome. Looking into the steps of the degradation of a transcript in E. coli, what is known is that in the first place the endoribonucleases can cleave the substrates so that later the exoribonucleases can work on the products. RhIB has very little activity by itself but the interaction with RNAse E can stimulate it. The role of enolase in the degradation process of RNA is still not properly described, apparently it helps the complex to be more specific during the process of degradation.

One particularly intriguing aspect of the bacterial RNA degradosome is the presence of metabolic enzymes in many of the studied complexes. In addition to the enolase enzyme present in the E. coli degradosome, the metabolic enzymes aconitase and phosphofructokinase have been identified in the C. crescentus and B. subtilis degradosomes respectively. The reason for the presence of these enzymes is currently unclear.

== Degradosome activation ==
This multi-protein complex is stimulated by a non-coding RNA, called miRNA in Eukaryotic cells and sRNA in bacteria. Small sequences of aminoacid are usually used to target mRNA for its destruction. From here, there are two ways to do it: targeting translation-initiation region (TIR) or coding DNA sequence (CDS). Firstly, to attach sRNA to targeted mRNA a Hfq (chaperone protein) is needed. Once the attachment is done, if the complex Hfq-sRna ends on TIR, it blocks ribosome binding site (RBS) so ribosomes cannot translate, and activates nucleases (RNase E) to eliminate mRNA. Another possibility is ending on another region, that makes the complex work as a finisher point of the translation. This way, the ribosomes can do their job of decoding, process that stops when they arrive to the complex, where all the destruction procedure is switched on.

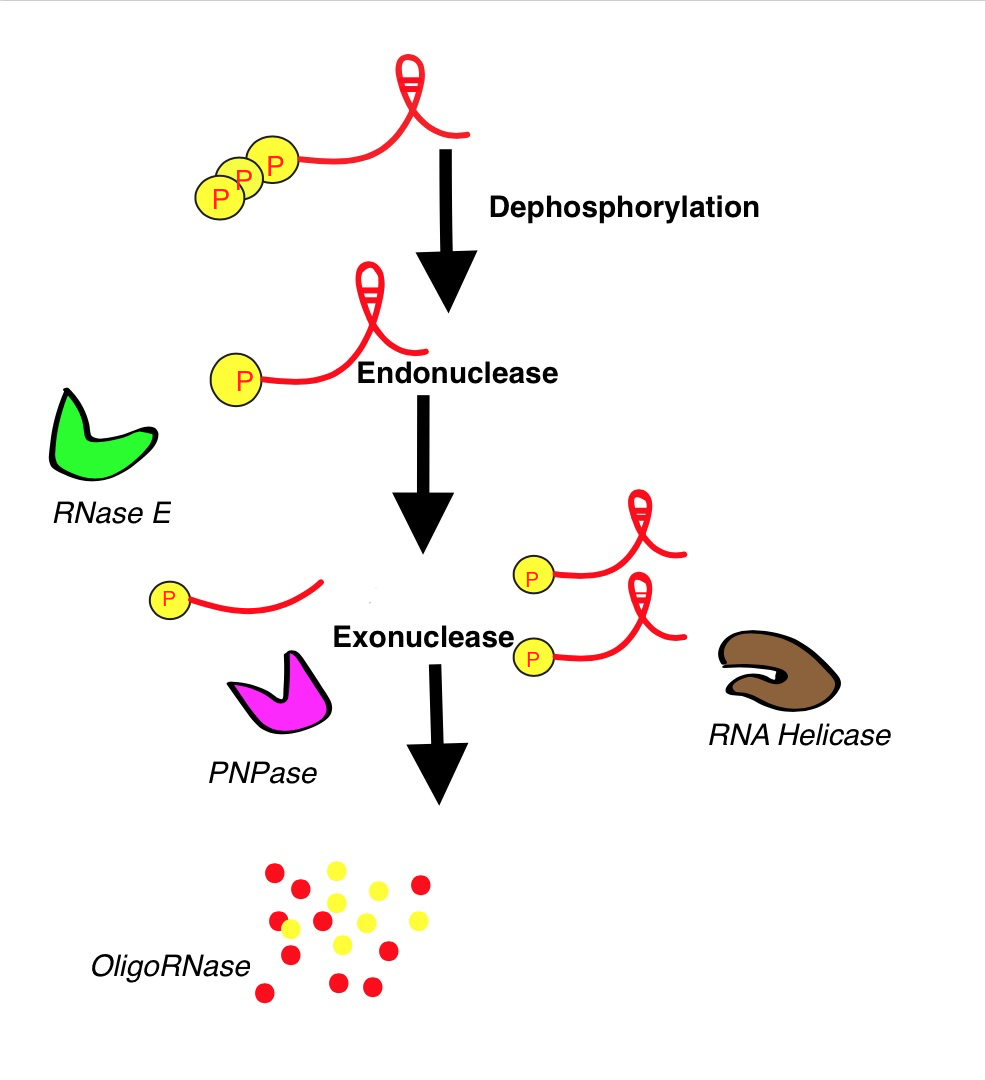
This picture shows RNA's degradation process with the specific phases.

== RNA degradation ==
The RNA's destruction process is very complicated. To make it easier to understand, we use as an example the mRNA degradation procedure in Escherichia coli because it is the best known process. It is mediated mainly by endo- and ribo- nucleases. The enzymes RNase II and PNPase (polynucleotide phosphorylase) degrade mRNA in a 3'→5' way. The degradosome has 4 compartments that have several ribonucleases. Initially, the synthesized RNA is a polyphosphate structure. This is why the dephosphorylation is needed, in order to obtain monophosphate by the action of a RNA pyrophosphohydrolase PppH. The transcripts have two parts: the phosphate terminal (P-terminal) and a stem-loop structure as an end. The P-terminal is endoribonucleolytically cleavaged by RNase E, while the stem-loop is digested by RNA helicases. If there are any secondary structures, the performance of polymerase PAP is needed to simplify the reduction by exoribonucleases such as PNPase. Finally, the scraps are processed by oligoribonucleases.

The process is analogous in other species and only changes in the enzymatic machinery. For example, bacillus subtilis instead of using RNase E as the endo-ribonuclease, it uses RNase Y or RNase J or in the archaea is used an exosome (vesicle) to this job.

== Evolution ==
The degradosome, which is dynamic in conformation, variable in composition and non-essential under determined laboratory conditions, has nevertheless been maintained throughout the evolution of many bacterial species (Archaea, Eukaryote, Escherichia coli, Mitochondria, etc.), due most likely to its diverse contributions in global cellular regulation. It has been experimentally demonstrated that the presence of degradosome is a selective benefit for E. coli.

Degradosome-like structures have been thought to be part of many γ-proteobactria and have actually been found in other remote bacterial lineages. They are built upon RNase E. However, the composition of these degradosome-like assemblies is not always the same, it may be different on some proteic components.

== The RNA degradosome of E. coli ==
Humans and other animals have E. coli as a commensal in their intestinal tract. It is one of the most studied organisms at laboratories and it has been a useful model for understanding genetic regulation in bacteria and other domains of life. The RNA degradosome of E. coli is a structure that plays diverse roles in RNA metabolism. It shares homologous components and functional analogy with similar assemblies found in all domains of life. One of its components is an ATP-dependent motor that is activated through protein-protein interactions and cooperates with the ribonucleases in an energy-dependent mode of RNA degradation.

E. coli does not have a 5'→3' degradation pathway. Its mRNA does not have 5' capped ends and there are not any 5'→3' exonucleases known. The same thing happens to other eubacteria, hence the 5'→3' degradation pathway could be an exclusive trait of eukaryotic cells.

== See also ==
- Exosome complex
- Proteasome
