= Ribonuclease E =

Bacterial ribonuclease

Identifiers
- EC no.: 3.1.26.12
- CAS no.: 76106-82-6

Databases
- BRENDA: enzyme data
- ExPASy: NiceZyme view
- KEGG: enzyme entry
- MetaCyc: metabolic pathway
- Rhea: reactions
- PDB structures: RCSB PDB PDBe PDBsum
Search
- PMC: articles
- PubMed: articles
- NCBI: proteins

Ribonuclease E is a bacterial ribonuclease that participates in the processing of ribosomal RNA (9S to 5S rRNA) and the chemical degradation of bulk cellular RNA.

== Cellular localization ==
RNase E was suggested to be a part of the cell membrane protein complex, as it sediments with ribosomes and crude membranes. Microscopy has localized tagged RNase E to the inner cytoplasmic membrane or a helical cytoskeletal structure closely associated with the inner layer.

== Protein structure ==
This enzyme contains 1,061 residues and separates into two distinct functional regions, which are a large domain located at the 5'N-terminus and a small domain located at the 3' C-terminus. While N-terminal half forms a catalytic domain, C-terminal half forms a degradosome scaffolding domain. A metal-binding pocket separates them in the middle of the RNase E protein structure. Although degradosome formation does not play a key role for E. coli growth, the deletion of the C-terminal half has been found to decrease the rate of decay of some RNase E substrates.

Ribonuclease E function in tetrameric conformation, which contains four subunits associate with each other to create a structure that looks like two scissors connected at the handle region. The scissor blade is made of a large domain, and the handle is made of the small domain. In the catalytic site of the large domain, there are four subdomains that include an RNase H subdomain, a DNase I subdomain, an S1 subdomain, and a 5' sensing region. These four subunits are divided base on their function and similarity to homologous structural folds. RNase H is located at the beginning of N-terminal and named after the RNase H endoribonuclease family since they share a similar structure; however, RNase H serves as a structural function rather than catalytic function because it is lack of active-site residue. Next, the S1 subdomain and 5' sensing region are implanted in RNase H fold. The RNase E S1 domain adopts an OB-fold in which flexible loops are attached to a well-ordered five-stranded β-barrel core. In the ribonuclease E, the S1 domain not only aids in the formation of the tetrameric quaternary structure by dimerization but also serves as a substrate-binding site to facilitate RNA hydrolysis by the catalytic domains within this tetrameric enzyme. With S1 subdomain, 5' sensing region functions as a substrate-binding site that helps to stabilize the target RNA molecule on one subunit so that the other subunit within a dimer can cleave the RNA of interest. The 5' sensing region located at a distance from the catalytic site, which resides on the DNase I subdomain. The last subdomain of the RNase E catalytic site is DNase I, which is named for its conformational similarity to an endonuclease structure that cleaves double-stranded DNA. In ribonuclease E, DNase I subdomain self-complements to dominate the dimer interface. Also, there is two magnesium ion binding site that mediates cleavage by hydrolytic attack of the RNA backbone and two zinc ion binding site that aids in stabilization of a dimer made of two subunits.

== Function ==
Escherichia coli endoribonuclease E has a significant influence on gene expression. It is not only essential for the maturation of ribosomal RNA (rRNA) and transfer RNA (tRNA) but also the rapid degradation of messenger RNA (mRNA) by hydrolysis reaction.

In the maturation of rRNA precursor, the substrates for processing are not naked RNAs but somewhat incomplete, unmodified pre-rRNA-ribosomal protein complexes. Both pre-16S and pre-23S rRNAs are excised from the primary RNA-protein complex by RNase III, which activates subsequent steps in rRNA maturation by generating 5' monophosphorylated cleavage products. RNase E further shortens the 17S precursor of 16S rRNA. This action helps to facilitate 5' maturation of rRNA by RNase G and make two cleavages to excise pre-5S rRNA. In the case of tRNAs, approximately 50 of the 86 tRNA species in E. coli require RNase E. The ribonuclease E cleaves tRNA-containing primary transcripts in the 3' end of the tRNAs. These cleavages serve to separate individual tRNA precursors and to separate tRNAs from mRNAs or terminator sequences. The primary function of ribonuclease E is to cleave at a site beyond the mature 3' end to enable access by 3' exonucleases.

In mRNA degradation, ribonuclease E recognizes and cleaves the single-stranded RNA in A- and U-rich regions. The RNase E catalytic domain binds selectively to 5′-monophosphate RNA termini but has a mode of cleavage in the 3′ to 5′ direction. RNase E can identify cleavage sites by a 3′ to 5′ scanning mechanism. The anchor of the RNase E to the 5′-monophosphorylated end of these substrates orients the enzyme for directional cleavages that occur in a processive mode. In the absence of RNA, the S1 subdomain and 5′ sensing site of RNase E are both exposed to the surrounding solvent, allowing RNA to bind readily. In the presence of RNA, target RNA binds to the combined S1 subdomain and 5′ sensor in the open configuration. The RNA is anchored primarily by the binding affinity of the 5′ sensor and oriented by the hydrophobic surface patch on the S1 subdomain. While the S1 subdomain is acting to orient the molecule, the 5′ sensing pocket likely contributes a significant portion of the substrate-binding affinity. These two sites hold the RNA while the fusion 5/S1 subdomain moves as a single complex into the closed configuration. It brings the substrate into proximity to the catalytic site where a hydroxyl group attacks the phosphate backbone by nucleophilic attack reaction. This response is mediated by magnesium ion. When the RNA of interest is cleaved, and the products of the reaction are eventually released as RNase E returns to the open configuration. Besides, RNase E can be self-regulated whereby the mRNA of ribonuclease E serves as a sensor for total cellular RNase E activity and thus limits RNase E activity due to the availability of substrates and changes of growth rate.

== Comparison ribonuclease E of E. coli and other organisms ==
Based on the alignment for sequences of different bacteria correlated to ribonuclease E of Escherichia coli, it appears that about 70% of the sequences are highly conserved at the beginning of sequences and poorly conserved toward the end of sequences. When comparing the five other organisms' sequences to the sequence of the ribonuclease E, it looks like most of the sequences share the same residues at the N-terminal since the member from ribonuclease E/G family has the same hydrolyze function. In other words, the large catalytic domain of the ribonuclease E/G family member is almost the same. In contrast, the small structural domain, which is located at the C-terminus, is varied for different organisms since the small domain contains a structural sequence that serves as scaffolding for other enzymes. For instance, the ribonuclease E that is in the Cedecea davisae came from the S3JYP0 gene. When observing the structure of the ribonuclease E in Cedecea davisae, the catalytic domain contains S1 motif positioned at 31-119 residue on the sequence and a metal-binding site placed at the 404-407 residue on the sequences which are the same position as S1 domain and metal-binding domain on RNase E of Escherichia coli.

== Evolutionary history ==
Ribonucleases (RNases) protein family involved mainly in RNA metabolism, playing essential roles in RNA maturation, RNA end-turnover, and the degradation of aberrant RNAs or expired species in the cell. They are classified into exoribonucleases and endoribonucleases based on their degradative activities. Ribonuclease E (RNase E) was initially discovered as an endoribonuclease from Escherichia coli strain K12. Based on DNA sequence analysis, orthologs of E. coli RNase E were predicted to exist among dozens of evolutionarily different bacterial species. In E. coli, the ribonuclease E enzyme plays an essential part in controlling cell viability by regulating RNA metabolism, such as the decay of most mRNAs and activates the processing of pre-tRNAs. Besides the degradative function, RNase E is necessary for the maturation of precursors of 5S ribosomal RNA, tRNAs, and the M1 RNA component of the RNase P ribozyme.
