= Polynucleotide phosphorylase =

Class of enzymes

Polynucleotide Phosphorylase
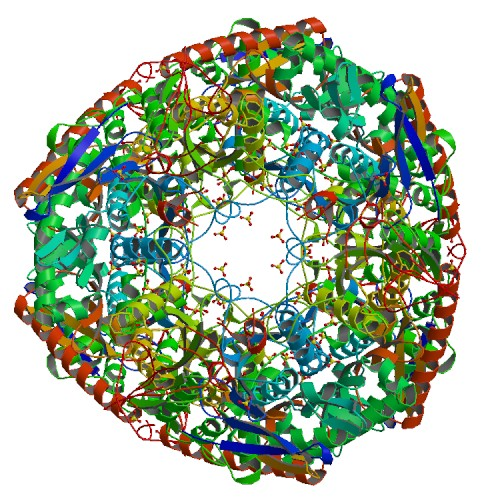
- Structure of the PNPase trimer from Streptomyces antibioticus. PDB 1e3p.

Identifiers
- EC no.: 2.7.7.8
- CAS no.: 9014-12-4

Databases
- BRENDA: enzyme data
- ExPASy: NiceZyme view
- KEGG: enzyme entry
- MetaCyc: metabolic pathway
- Rhea: reactions
- PDB structures: RCSB PDB PDBe PDBsum
- Gene Ontology: AmiGO / QuickGO
Search
- PMC: articles
- PubMed: articles
- NCBI: proteins

Polynucleotide Phosphorylase (PNPase) is a bifunctional enzyme with a phosphorolytic 3' to 5' exoribonuclease activity and a 3'-terminal oligonucleotide polymerase activity. That is, it dismantles the RNA chain starting at the 3' end and working toward the 5' end. It also synthesizes long, highly heteropolymeric tails in vivo. It accounts for all of the observed residual polyadenylation in strains of Escherichia coli missing the normal polyadenylation enzyme. Discovered by Marianne Grunberg-Manago working in Severo Ochoa's lab in 1955, the RNA-polymerization activity of PNPase was initially believed to be responsible for DNA-dependent synthesis of messenger RNA, a notion that was disproven by the late 1950s.

It is involved in mRNA processing and degradation in bacteria, plants, and animals.

In humans, the enzyme is encoded by the PNPT1 gene. In its active form, the protein forms a ring structure consisting of three PNPase molecules. Each PNPase molecule consists of two RNase PH domains, an S1 RNA binding domain and a K-homology domain. The protein is present in bacteria and in the chloroplasts and mitochondria of some eukaryotic cells. In eukaryotes and archaea, a structurally and evolutionary related complex exists, called the exosome complex.

The same abbreviation (PNPase) is also used for another, otherwise unrelated enzyme, Purine nucleoside phosphorylase.

Human PNPase I

Identifiers
- Symbol: PNPASE
- Alt. symbols: PNPase, OLD35, old-35
- NCBI gene: 87178
- HGNC: 23166
- OMIM: 610316
- PDB: 1E3P
- RefSeq: NM_033109
- UniProt: Q8TCS8

Other data
- EC number: 2.7.7.8
- Locus: Chr. 2 p15
Search for
- Structures: Swiss-model
- Domains: InterPro
