= Scleromyositis =

Autoimmune disease

- Other names: PM/Scl overlap syndrome

Scleromyositis, is an autoimmune disease (a disease in which the immune system attacks the body). People with scleromyositis have symptoms of both systemic scleroderma and either polymyositis or dermatomyositis, and is therefore considered an overlap syndrome. Although it is a rare disease, it is one of the more common overlap syndromes seen in scleroderma patients, together with MCTD and Antisynthetase syndrome. Autoantibodies often found in these patients are the anti-PM/Scl (anti-exosome) antibodies.

The symptoms that are seen most often are typical symptoms of the individual autoimmune diseases and include Raynaud's phenomenon, arthritis, myositis and scleroderma. Treatment of these patients is therefore strongly dependent on the exact symptoms with which a patient reports to a physician and is similar to treatment for the individual autoimmune disease, often involving either immunosuppressive or immunomodulating drugs.

== Signs and symptoms ==
Symptoms vary but they mostly involve skin disorders. The signs to look for include Raynaud's phenomenon, arthritis, myositis and scleroderma. Visual symptoms include discoloring of the skin and painful swelling.

== Cause ==
- There is no distinct cause for scleromyositis.
- Scleroderma can develop in every age group from infants to the elderly, but its onset is most frequent between the ages of 25 and 55.
- In most cases it is observed that the disease involves an overproduction of collagen.

== Diagnosis ==
Diagnosis is by skin tests. Typically, after a consultation with a rheumatologist, the disease will be diagnosed. A dermatologist is also another specialist that can diagnose. Blood studies and numerous other specialized tests depending upon which organs are affected.

=== Scleroderma overlap syndrome ===
People with scleroderma overlap syndrome have symptoms of both systemic scleroderma and/or polymyositis and dermatomyositis:

- Scleroderma: a group of rare diseases that involve the hardening and tightening of the skin and connective tissues.
- Polymyositis: a rare inflammatory disease that causes muscle weakness affecting both sides of your body.
- Dermatomyositis: an inflammatory disease of skin and muscle marked especially by muscular weakness and skin rash.

Scleroderma is a connective tissue disease that causes fibrosis and vascular abnormalities, but that also has an autoimmune component, and can include connective tissues complications. Diagnostic testing includes screening for the positive antinuclear antibody.

== Treatment ==
There is no current cure. The only way to treat this disease is by treating symptoms. Commonly people are prescribed immunosuppressive drugs. Another route would be to take collagen regulation drugs.

== Recent research ==
As of 2006 it is unclear which antibodies will best treat connective tissue diseases.

One study from 2014 showed some potential of the synthetic drug Rituximab in treating this class of overlap syndromes.
