= LRRC74A =

Protein-coding gene

Identifiers
- Aliases: LRRC74A, C14orf166B, LRRC74, leucine rich repeat containing 74A
- External IDs: MGI: 3646959; HomoloGene: 19331; GeneCards: LRRC74A; OMA:LRRC74A - orthologs

Gene location (Human)
| Chr. | Chromosome 14 (human) |
| Band | 14q24.3 | Start | 76,826,372 bp |
| Band | 14q24.3 | End | 76,870,304 bp |

Gene location (Mouse)
| Chr. | Chromosome 12 (mouse) |
| Band | 12|12 D2 | Start | 86,781,143 bp |
| Band | 12|12 D2 | End | 86,810,571 bp |
RNA expression pattern
| Bgee | Human / Mouse (ortholog); Top expressed in: left testis; right testis; sperm; gonad; muscle tissue; face; body of pancreas; sensory nervous system; sensory organ; mouth / Top expressed in: spermatid; seminiferous tubule; spermatocyte; lumbar subsegment of spinal cord; pancreas; islet of Langerhans; liver; More reference expression data |
| BioGPS | n/a |
Orthologs
| Species | Human | Mouse |
| Entrez | 145497 | 627607 |
| Ensembl | ENSG00000100565 | ENSMUSG00000059114 |
| UniProt | Q0VAA2 | F6QBN8 |
| RefSeq (mRNA) | NM_194287; NM_001385106; NM_001385107; NM_001385108 | NM_001195767 |
| RefSeq (protein) | NP_919263 | NP_001182696 |
| Location (UCSC) | Chr 14: 76.83 – 76.87 Mb | Chr 12: 86.78 – 86.81 Mb |
| PubMed search |
- Wikidata
| View/Edit Human | View/Edit Mouse |

Leucine-rich repeat-containing protein 74A (LRRC74A), is a protein encoded by the LRRC74A gene. The protein LRRC74A (aliases C14orf166B, 14q24.3) is localized in the cytoplasm. It has a calculated molecular weight of approximately 55 kDa. The LRRC74A protein is nominally expressed in the testis, salivary gland, and pancreas.

== Gene ==
The LRRC74A gene, also known as C14orf166B, is located on the positive-sense strand of locus 14q24.3. The full unspliced gene contains 17 exons. LRRC74A spans from 76,826,408 to 76,870,304 for a total length of 43.9 kpb.

=== Transcripts ===
LRRC74A has four transcript variants. The most abundant variant is LRRC74A transcript variant 1, which is 1710 nucleotides in length.

LRRC74A transcript variants
| Accession number | Transcript length | Number of exons | Protein length | Isoform |
| NM_194287.3 | 1710 | 14 | 488 | 1 |
| NM_001322426.2 | 1861 | 5 | 471 | 2 |
| NM_001105519.3 | 718 | 4 | 201 | 3 |
| NM_001105519.3 | 718 | 4 | 201 | 4 |

== Protein ==
The LRRC74A protein is 488 amino acids in length with a predicted molecular weight of 55 kDA and an isoelectric point of 5.22. It has higher than normal levels of methionine and asparagine.

=== Domains and structure ===
The LRRC74A protein contains eight leucine-rich repeat domains in its sequence. LRRC74A isoform 1 secondary structure is made up of alternating alpha helices and beta sheets. Tertiary structure predictions show a horseshoe-shaped protein with high similarity to ribonuclease inhibitor

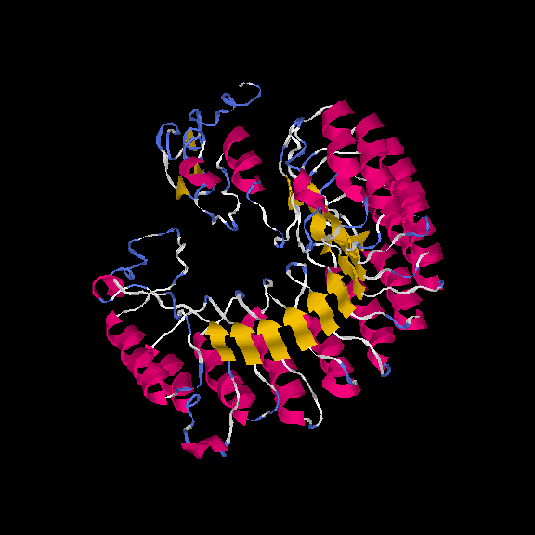
LRRC74A Tertiary Structure prediction by I-TASSER

=== Isoforms ===
LRRC74A has four splice isoforms. The most abundant isoform is LRRC74A protein isoform 1 which is 488 amino acids in length.

LRRC74A protein isoforms
| Name | Transcript variant | Peptide length | Domains present |
|---|---|---|---|
| Isoform 1 | 1 | 488 aa | 8 LRR domains |
| Isoform 2 | 2 | 471 aa | 6 LRR domains |
| Isoform 3 | 3 | 464 aa | 6 LRR domains |
| Isoform 4 | 4 | 427 aa | 7 LRR domains |

== Regulation ==
=== Expression pattern ===
LRRC74A has overall low levels of expression compared to other proteins but within the tissues it is expressed in, it appears most prominently in the testes, salivary gland, and pancreas. Within the cell, LRRC74A is localized to the cytosol.

=== Transcript level regulation ===
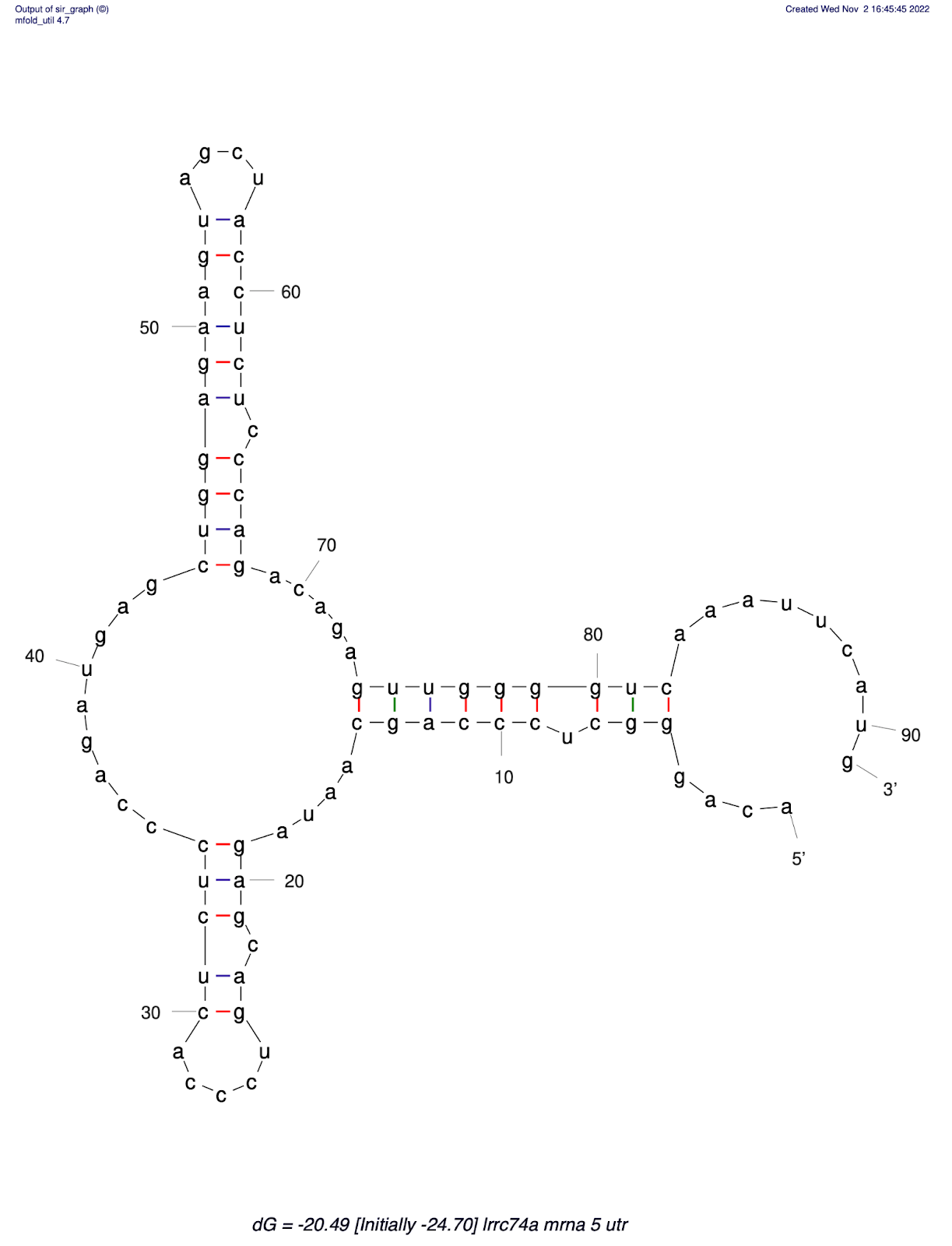
Predicted 5' UTR folding structure of LRRC74A

The 5' UTR of LRRC74A transcript variant 1 is 91 bp in length. Analysis of potential folding structures identifies two possible stemloop structures.

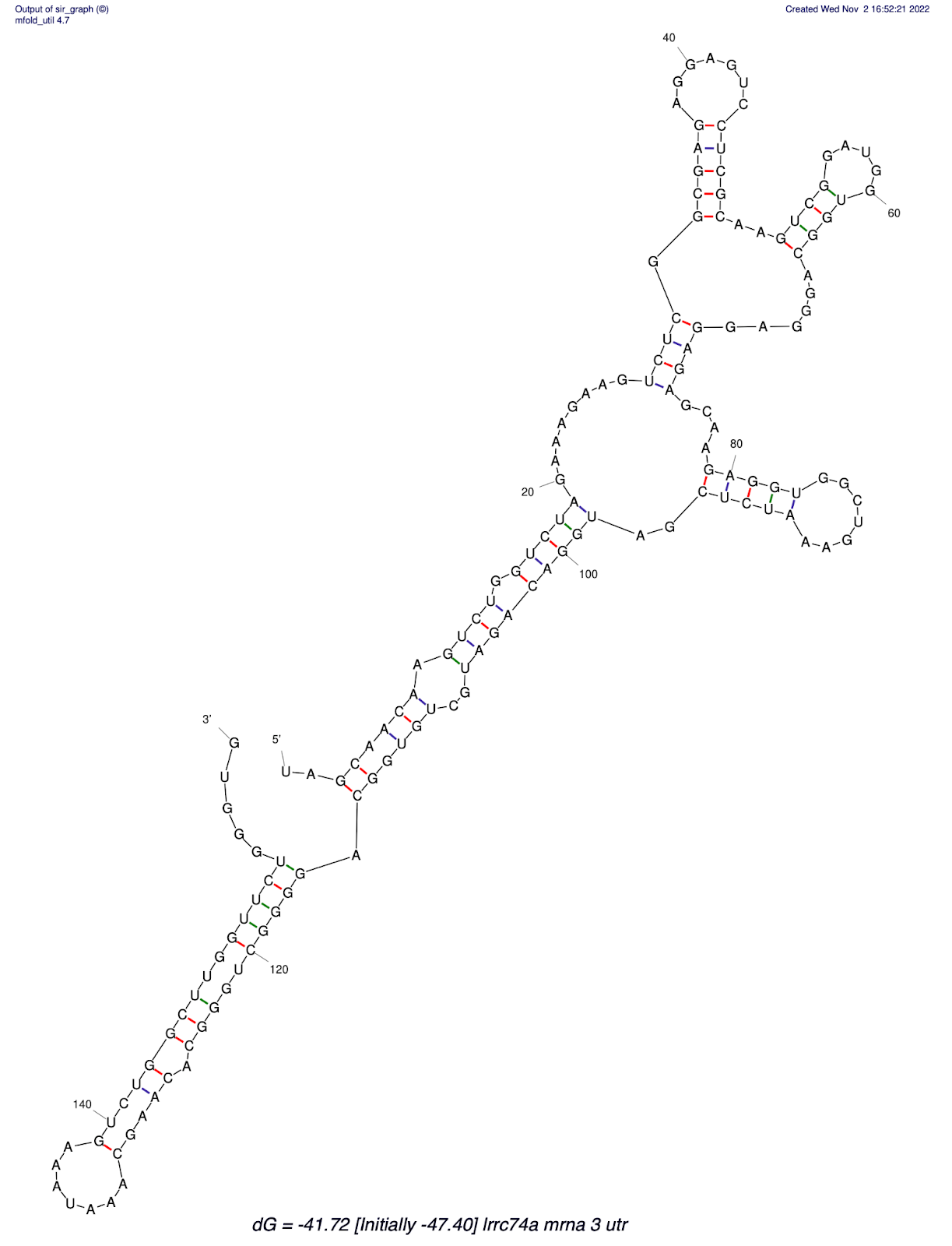
Predicted folding structure of the 3' UTR of LRRC74A

The 3' UTR is 158 bp in length and contains one polyadenylation signal. It contains four predicted stemloop structures, with three loops closer to the 5' end of the UTR and one loop closer to the 3' end of the UTR.

== Homology and evolution ==
=== Paralogs ===
The human LRRC74A gene has one paralog called LRRC74B. It is located at 22q11.21

=== Orthologs ===
LRRC74A has orthologs in species as distant as tunicates. Mammalian orthologs are moderately similar to human LRRC74A, with percent similarity greater than 80%. Orthologs in reptiles, birds and amphibians range from 65% to 40%. In fish and invertebrates, identity ranges from 40% to 20%. No orthologs were found in fungi, bacteria or plants.

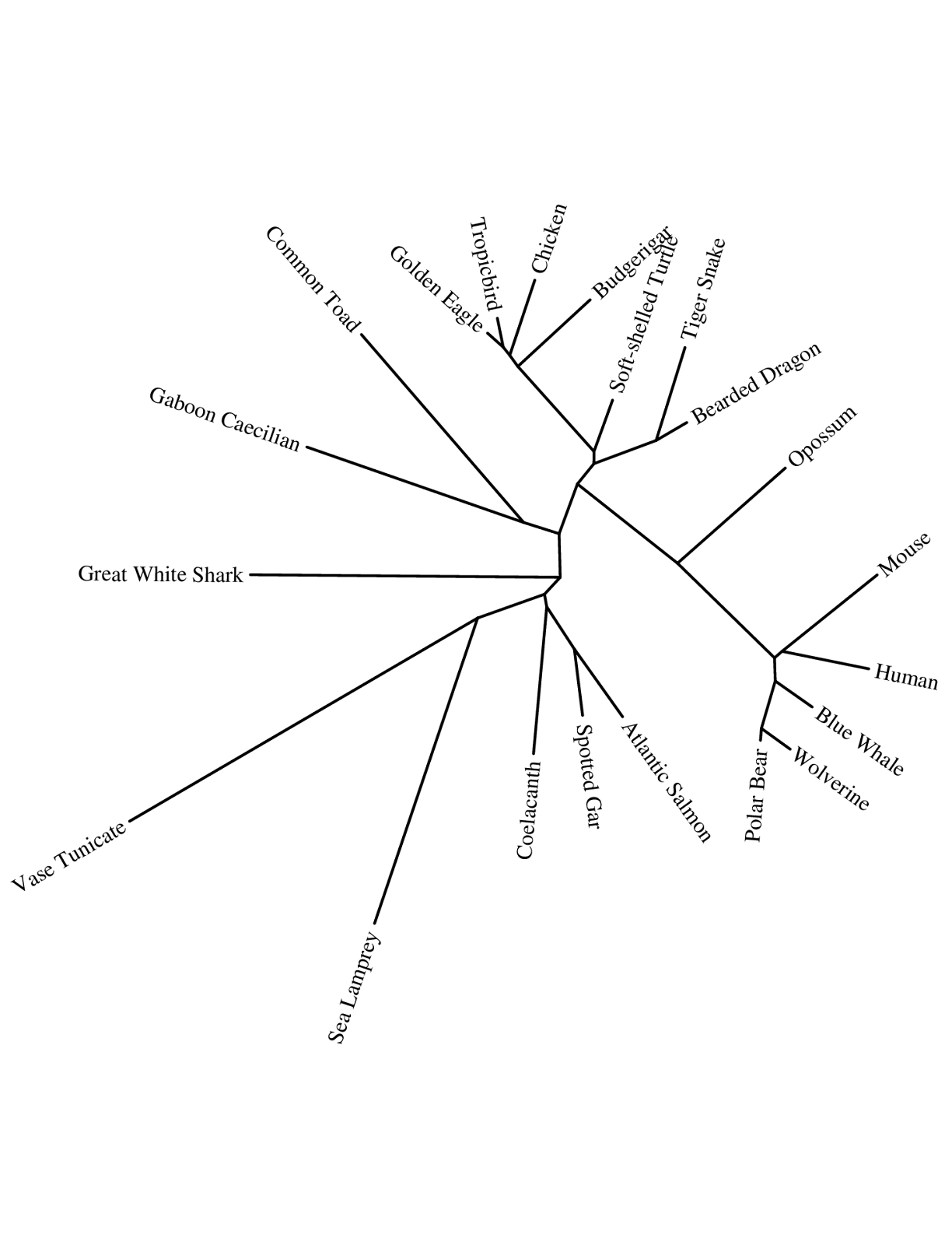
Unrooted phylogenetic tree depicting the evolution of LRRC74A

| | Genus species | Common name | Taxonomic order | Estimated date of divergence (MYA) | Accession number | Sequence length (aa) | Sequence identity (%) | Sequence similarity (%) |
|---|---|---|---|---|---|---|---|---|
| Mammalia | Homo sapiens | Human | Primates | 0 | NP_919263.2 | 488 | 100 | 100 |
| | Mus musculus | Mouse | Rodentia | 87 | NP_001182696.1 | 487 | 65.7 | 77.4 |
| | Gulo gulo | Wolverine | Carnivora | 94 | KAI5767761.1 | 488 | 74.6 | 86.3 |
| | Ursus maritimus | Polar bear | Carnivora | 94 | XP_040497188.1 | 548 | 60.6 | 70.6 |
| | Balaenoptera musculus | Blue whale | Artiodactyla | 94 | XP_036697954.1 | 482 | 68.9 | 80.1 |
| | Gracilinanus agilia | Agile gracile opossum | Marsupialia | 106 | XP_044518037.1 | 468 | 52.5 | 71.5 |
| Aves | Gallus gallus | Chicken | Galliformes | 319 | XP_040528719.1 | 476 | 42.8 | 60.9 |
| | Melopsittacus undulatus | Budgerigar | Psittaciformes | 319 | XP_005149032.1 | 494 | 46.4 | 64.6 |
| | Aquila chrysaetos | Golden eagle | Accipitriformes | 319 | XP_029863093.1 | 492 | 46 | 62.1 |
| | Phaethon lepturus | White-tailed tropicbird | Phaethontiformes | 319 | XP_010285698.1 | 478 | 44.3 | 61.5 |
| Reptilia | Pelodiscus sinensis | Chinese softshell turtle | Testudines | 319 | XP_025037771.1 | 486 | 49.5 | 68 |
| | Pogona vitticeps | Central bearded dragon | Squamata | 319 | XP_020649579.1 | 483 | 48 | 64.5 |
| | Notechis scutatus | Tiger snake | Squamata | 319 | XP_026520078.1 | 491 | 45.2 | 61.9 |
| Amphibia | Geotrypetes seraphini | Gaboon caecilian | Gymnophiona | 353 | XP_033809167.1 | 540 | 35.6 | 50.3 |
| | Bufo bufo | Common toad | Anura | 353 | XP_040268304.1 | 536 | 34.5 | 51.4 |
| Fish | Latimeria chalumnae | West Indian Ocean coelacanth | Latimeriidae | 414 | XP_014341482.1 | 456 | 47.5 | 66.2 |
| | Lepisosteus oculatus | Spotted gar | Lepisosteiformes | 431 | XP_015205589.1 | 450 | 42 | 62.5 |
| | Salmo salar | Atlantic salmon | Salmoniformes | 431 | XP_045549789.1 | 648 | 32.3 | 45.1 |
| | Carcharodon carcharias | Great white shark | Chondrichthyes | 464 | XP_041070161.1 | 727 | 24 | 37.4 |
| | Petromyzon marinus | Sea lamprey | Agnatha | 510 | XP_032820627.1 | 510 | 32.1 | 49.6 |
| Invertebrata | Ciona intestinalis | Vase tunicate | Enterogona | 603 | XP_002120047.1 | 661 | 24.5 | 40.6 |

=== Evolution ===
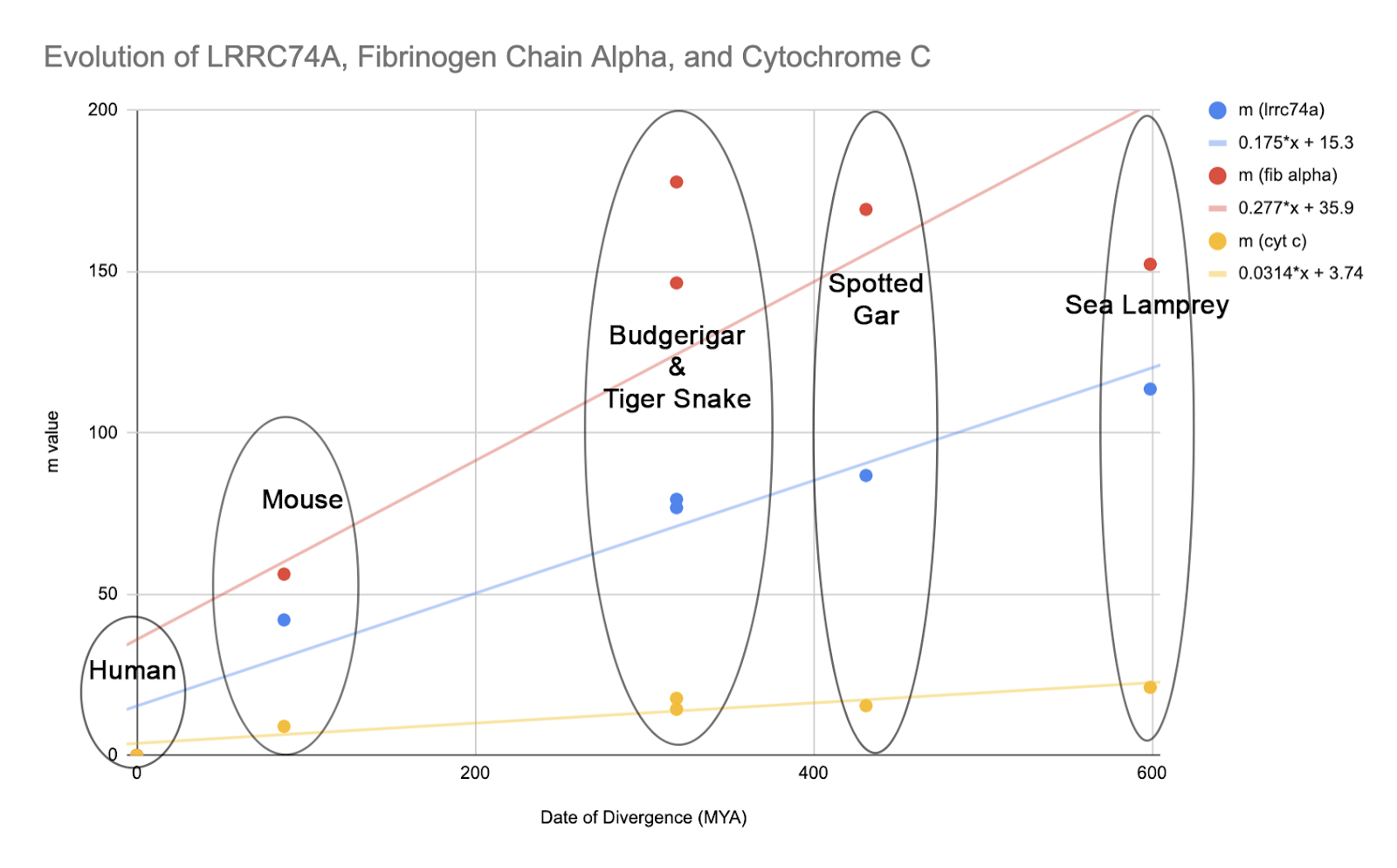

The LRRC74A gene appears most distantly in tunicates which diverged from humans approximately 603 million years ago. Orthologs of LRRC74A and LRRC74B also occur in tunicates. LRRC74A evolves at a moderately fast rate; a 1% change in amino acid sequence required around 10 million years. Based on sequence similarity of orthologs, LRRC74A evolves at a rate in the middle of cytochrome c and fibrinogen alpha.

== Clinical significance ==
=== Disease association ===
==== COVID-19 ====
A GWAS evaluating genetic mutations and clinical outcomes of patients who contracted COVID-19 found that a mutation in the LRRC74A gene was associated with higher mortality rates in infected patients, with the mutation being 7.4% more prevalent in deceased patients than living patients.
