= Seminal RNase =

Bovine seminal RNase (BS-RNase) is a member of the ribonuclease superfamily produced by the bovine seminal vesicles. This enzyme can not be differentiated from its members distinctly since there are more features that this enzyme shares with its family members than features that it possess alone. The research on the question of how new functions arrive in proteins in evolution led the scientists to find an uncommon consequence for a usual biological event called gene conversion in the case of the ribonuclease (RNase) protein family. The most well-known member of this family, RNase A (also called pancreatic RNase), is expressed in the pancreas of oxen. It serves to digest RNA in intestine, and evolved from bacteria fermenting in the stomach of the first ox. The homologous RNase, called seminal RNase, differs from RNase A by 23 amino acids and is expressed in seminal plasma in the concentration of 1-1.5 mg/ml, which constitutes more than 3% of the fluid protein content. Bovine seminal ribonuclease (BS-RNase) is a homologue of RNase A with specific antitumor activity.

== Functional properties of bovine seminal RNase ==
The physiological role of this enzyme is not yet found and thus it is still a mystery why the seminal fluid in bovine has such a higher concentration of this enzyme. In the evolutionary process, it has acquired new behaviors such as being a dimer with composite active sites binding firmly to anionic glycolipids, including bovine spermatozoa seminolipid, a fusogenic sulfated galactolipid possessing immunosuppressive and cytostatic activities whereas the ancestral RNase does not possess these behaviors. The homolog of RNase A, bovine seminal ribonuclease (BS-RNase), has a specific antitumor activity. In the immunoregulation of both male and female genital systems, the seminal plasma plays a prominent role in immunosuppression. The direct or indirect interference of the seminal plasma with the function of many types of immunocompetent cells including T cells, B cells, NK cells and macrophages has been shown. These effects of immunosuppression are not species-specific and are found to be in physiological concentrations that are normally seen in the urogenital tract of females. RNase secretion has not been detected in the seminal fluid of any other mammal.

== Origin of seminal RNase gene ==
The recruitment of established proteins after the gene duplication leads to play some new biomolecular functions. Among different models that exist, one model suggests that after the gene duplication, among the two copies of genes, one will be subjected to continuous evolution under ancestral dictated functional constraints whereas the duplicate meanwhile will not be restricted by a functional role and feels free to find protein “structure space”. In the end, it may come with encoded new behaviors that which are required for a new physiological function and thereby discourse the selective advantage. In any case, we may consider it as an ambiguous model since most duplicates have to become pseudogenes, which are considered as an inexpressible genetic information (referred to as “junk DNA”) in just a few million years. Because selective pressure can do nothing much with duplicated genes, they are prone to deleterious mutations that present their incapability to encode a protein useful for any function. This restricts to use a functionally unconstrained gene duplicate as a tool for investigating protein structure space of new behaviors that might discourse selectable physiological function. Then how would new functions arise in proteins? One of the possibilities is the resurrection of the pseudogenes due to some biological events like gene conversion. One such an example is the resurrection of the bovine seminal RNase gene.

From the laboratory reconstructions of ancient RNases, it is shown that each of these traits was absent in the most recent common ancestor of seminal and pancreatic RNase and a bit later arose in the seminal lineage after the divergence of the above two protein families. The RNase genes from all taxa in a true ruminant phylogenetic tree that was constructed by parsimony analysis were analyzed by the researchers, and they revealed that early after the gene duplication, pancreatic RNases and seminal RNases separated at about 35 million years ago (MYA). Several marker substitutions, including Pro 19, Cys 32 and Lys 62, have been introduced in seminal RNase genes which made them to be recognized as different from their pancreatic cousins. Based on this, the seminal RNase family includes the taxa called saiga, sheep, duiker, kudu and cape buffalo, while peccary has been excluded from it. Later on, from the sequence analyses, mass spectrophotometry and western blotting studies on taxa that comes under the seminal RNase gene family, it has been revealed that they are consistent with the model which assumes that immediately after duplication the seminal RNase gene gained a physiological function and this function has been continued throughout the divergent evolution (each copy of gene gets evolved independently) and later on it was lost in all other species including modern kudu and cape buffalo except in modern oxen. This would require, however, that this function was lost independently multiple times in different lineages.

After the divergence of Cape buffalo in the lineage leading to modern oxen, the seminal RNase gene was resurrected very recently. It is intriguing to ask whether the domestication of the ox is related to the emergence of seminal RNase as a functioning protein. In modern oxen, does the seminal RNase gene have a function? This is the question that arises now. To address this question we can take into consideration the non-silent to silent substitution ratio in these gene families. The average ratio of non-silent to silent substitutions is 2:1 for unexpressed seminal RNase sequences, which is consistent with the model that these seminal RNases are pseudogenes and is close to that expected for random substitution in a gene that serves with no selected function. On other hand, the average ratio is less than 1:1 in case of pancreatic RNases which exhibits consistency with the model that states that pancreatic RNases are functional where selective pressure constrains the amino acid replacements. However, when the expressed ox seminal RNase is compared with its nearest unexpressed homologs (homologous chromosomes) in buffalo and kudu, a most remarkable ratio of non-silent to silent substitutions, 4:1, is observed. Pseudogenes in order to perform a new function and to provide new selected properties they search protein “structure space” with rapidly introduced amino acid replacements and such pseudogenes are only expected to have the above-mentioned remarkable ratio of non-silent to silent substitutions. The resurrection of the seminal RNase gene is evidently associated with the introduction of Cys 31.

Then how was this pseudogene resurrected? It is not so clear to say and one can note that the similarity between the region of the kudu deletion and the sequence of the expressed seminal RNase pseudogene extends some 70 base pairs into the 3’ –untranslated region are 89% identical (with 62 of the 70 nucleotides). We can expect that in order to repair the damaged seminal RNase there might be the gene conversion event took place between it and the pancreatic gene to create a new physiological evolution. Gene conversion is of two types - interallelic and interlocus gene conversions. The resurrection of seminal RNase gene function is believed to be the unexpected consequence of the interlocus gene conversion event of seminal RNase pseudogene with its homologous functional gene. In these recombination events, the genetic information is transferred from a donor functional locus to that of an acceptor pseudogene which is non-functional. Thus the non-functional seminal RNase pseudogene has acquired some new physiological functions being in the state of dead for many million years. This might be the first example in the literature with for the resurrection of a pseudogene by gene conversion event and it would be interesting to further test this data with more sequencing data. Later on another evolutionary aspect has been proposed in case of seminal RNase showing that the seminal RNase has been left with two quaternary forms: one is to exhibit special biological actions and the other is just an RNA-degrading enzyme. Based on this proposal the evolution of seminal RNase into these two structures that coexists and are more versatile structurally and biologically can be considered as treated as an evolutionary progress.

Scientists from all over the world studied and recognized a plenty of pseudogenes. They have launched several projects which are worldwide to identify and study the potential roles of pseudogenes. ENCODE is one of such projects. Even though the pseudogenes accelerate the issues formolecular analysis, they are still regarded as genome fossils that provide a sound record of evolution since they offer a plethora of diverse information for molecular analysis. The worldwide researchers are building different ways to identify the pseudogenes by various scheme and criteria for computation such that they give a set of pseudogenes that are consistent. Sometimes, the resurrected pseudogenes have been identified as functional and they may also be altered back to be non-functional, which again can be reversed. Not all the pseudogenes in a genome should be considered as a “junk DNA”. The evidence for functional pseudogenes strengthens their significance, and they have also become a hotspot in research due to their significance and possible resurrection. To study the characteristics of this soundless fossil in human and other organisms, researchers are contributing their attempts. In the near future, the real evolutionary fates of the pseudogenes will be found with the embedded picture of genome annotation.

== See also ==
- Molecular evolution
- Gene duplication
- Gene conversion
- Pseudogenes
- Ancestral gene resurrection
- Bovinae
- Ribonuclease A
- ENCODE
- Decapacitation factor
