= Vanadyl ribonucleoside =

Vanadyl ribonucleoside is a potent transition-state analog of ribonucleic acid and potent inhibitor of many species of ribonuclease formed from a vanadium coordination complex and one ribonucleoside. Vanadium's [Ar] 3d^{3} 4s^{2} electron configuration allows it to make five sigma bonds and two pi bonds with adjacent atoms.

== History ==
RNA is notoriously unstable and vulnerable to ribonucleases, which has thus been an obstacle to the production and analysis of the cellular transcriptome. First referenced by Berger et al., the substance was used to prevent the digestion of RNA during isolation from white blood cells, and was rapidly adopted for such purposes as the acquisition of RNA from green beans.

== Production ==
Vanadyl ribonucleoside is produced by combining vanadyl sulphate with various ribonucleosides (such as guanosine) in a 1:10 molar ratio.

== Use ==
Vanadyl ribonucleoside, along with other RNase inhibitors, has been a staple of molecular biochemistry since its invention by allowing for the stability of RNA in its storage and use.
