= RNASE1 =

Protein-coding gene in the species Homo sapiens

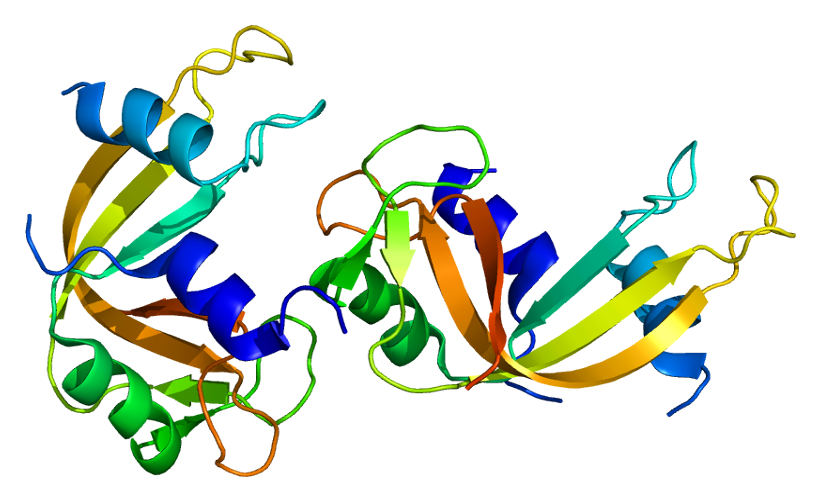

Identifiers
- Aliases: RNASE1, RAC1, RIB1, RNS1, ribonuclease A family member 1, pancreatic
- External IDs: OMIM: 180440; MGI: 97919; GeneCards: RNASE1
Available structures
PDB	Ortholog search: PDBe RCSB
PDB	List of PDB id codes 1DZA, 1E21, 1H8X, 1Z7X, 2E0J, 2E0L, 2E0M, 2E0O, 2K11, 2Q4G, 3F8G, 4KXH
Enzyme activity
EC #	BRENDA	ExPASy	KEGG	MetaCyc
4.6.1.18	↗	↗	↗	↗

Gene location (Human)
Chr.	Chromosome 14 (human)
Band	14q11.2	Start	20,801,228 bp
Band	14q11.2	End	20,802,855 bp

Gene location (Mouse)
Chr.	Chromosome 14 (mouse)
Band	14 C1|14 26.4 cM	Start	51,382,455 bp
Band	14 C1|14 26.4 cM	End	51,384,242 bp
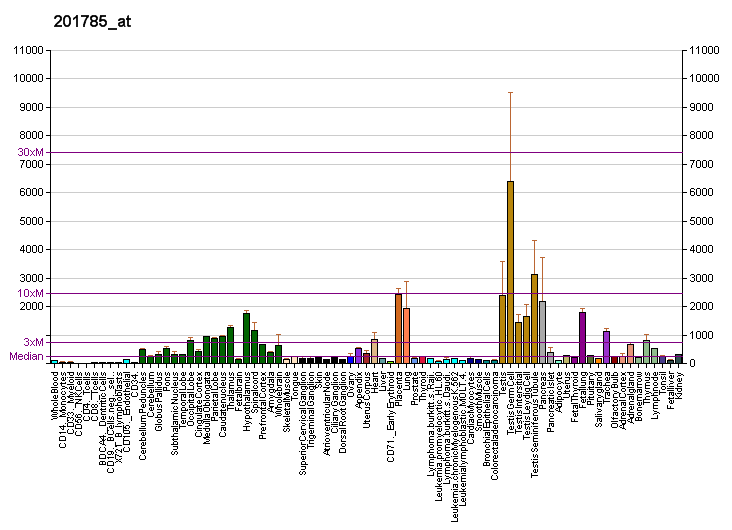
RNA expression pattern
Bgee	Human / Mouse (ortholog); Top expressed in: right testis; left testis; right lung; upper lobe of left lung; synovial joint; gallbladder; C1 segment; body of pancreas; decidua; synovial membrane / Top expressed in: vestibular membrane of cochlear duct; pyloric antrum; islet of Langerhans; parotid gland; vestibular sensory epithelium; crypt of lieberkuhn of small intestine; epithelium of stomach; stria vascularis; esophagus; duodenum; More reference expression data
BioGPS	More reference expression data
Gene ontology
Molecular function	nuclease activity; protein binding; hydrolase activity; ribonuclease A activity; nucleic acid binding; endonuclease activity; ribonuclease activity; lyase activity
Cellular component	extracellular region; extracellular exosome
Biological process	RNA phosphodiester bond hydrolysis, endonucleolytic; defense response to virus; RNA phosphodiester bond hydrolysis
Sources:Amigo / QuickGO
Orthologs
Databases	NCBI: entry; OMA: entry
Species	Human	Mouse
Entrez	6035	19752
Ensembl	ENSG00000129538	ENSMUSG00000035896
UniProt	P07998	P00683; Q8C6G3
RefSeq (mRNA)	NM_198235; NM_002933; NM_198232; NM_198234	NM_011271
RefSeq (protein)	NP_002924; NP_937875; NP_937877; NP_937878	NP_035401
Location (UCSC)	Chr 14: 20.8 – 20.8 Mb	Chr 14: 51.38 – 51.38 Mb
PubMed search
- Wikidata
View/Edit Human	View/Edit Mouse

Ribonuclease pancreatic is an enzyme that in humans is encoded by the RNASE1 gene.

== Function ==
According to the US National Library of Medicine, "This gene encodes a member of the pancreatic-type of secretory ribonucleases, a subset of the ribonuclease A super-family. The encoded endonuclease cleaves internal phosphodiester RNA bonds on the 3'-side of pyrimidine bases. It prefers poly(C) as a substrate and hydrolyses 2',3'-cyclic nucleotides, with a pH optimum near 8.0. The encoded protein is monomeric and more commonly acts to degrade ds-RNA over ss-RNA." Alternative splicing occurs at this locus and four transcript variants encoding the same protein have been identified.
