= Eosinophil-derived neurotoxin =

Protein-coding gene in the species Homo sapiens

RNASE2
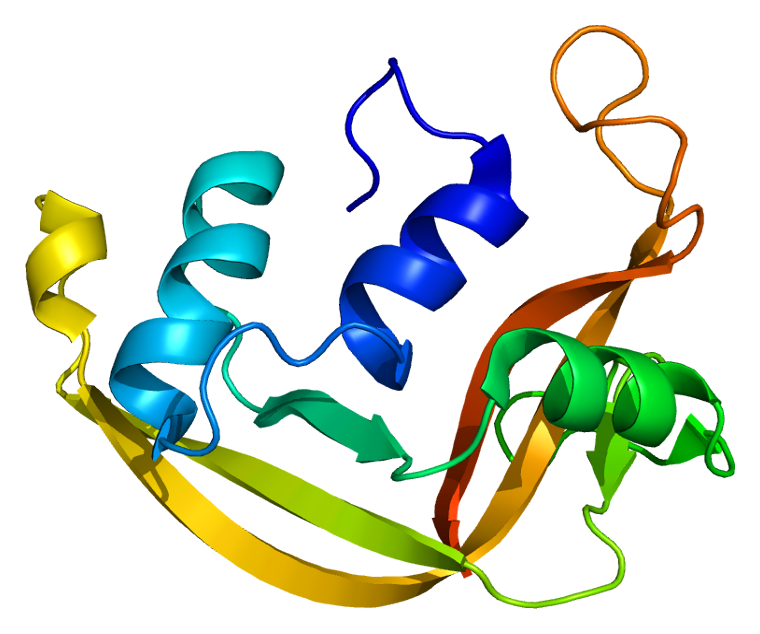

Identifiers
- Aliases: RNASE2, EDN, RAF3, RNS2, ribonuclease A family member 2
- External IDs: OMIM: 131410; MGI: 1858598; GeneCards: RNASE2
Available structures
PDB	Ortholog search: PDBe RCSB
PDB	List of PDB id codes 1GQV, 1HI2, 1HI3, 1HI4, 1HI5, 1K2A, 2BEX, 2BZZ, 2C01, 2C02, 2C05, 5E13
Enzyme activity
EC #	BRENDA	ExPASy	KEGG	MetaCyc
4.6.1.18	↗	↗	↗	↗

Gene location (Human)
Chr.	Chromosome 14 (human)
Band	14q11.2	Start	20,955,487 bp
Band	14q11.2	End	20,956,436 bp

Gene location (Mouse)
Chr.	Chromosome 14 (mouse)
Band	14|14 C1	Start	51,399,717 bp
Band	14|14 C1	End	51,400,475 bp
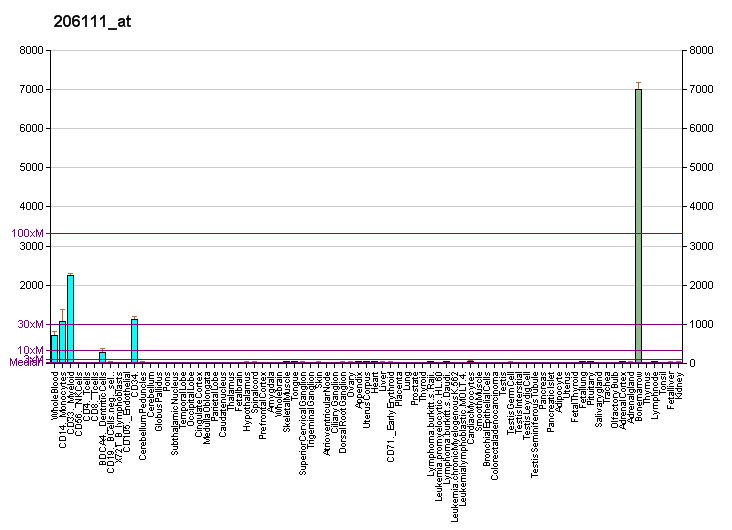
RNA expression pattern
Bgee	Human / Mouse (ortholog); Top expressed in: trabecular bone; bone marrow; bone marrow cell; monocyte; granulocyte; blood; right lung; spleen; germinal epithelium; right adrenal cortex / Top expressed in: lip; skin of external ear; skin of abdomen; esophagus; skin of back; gastrula; cervix; perirhinal cortex; CA3 field; entorhinal cortex; More reference expression data
BioGPS	More reference expression data
Gene ontology
Molecular function	nuclease activity; endonuclease activity; hydrolase activity; ribonuclease A activity; nucleic acid binding; lipopolysaccharide binding; ribonuclease activity; lyase activity
Cellular component	extracellular region; lysosome; extracellular exosome; azurophil granule lumen
Biological process	chemotaxis; RNA catabolic process; RNA phosphodiester bond hydrolysis, endonucleolytic; positive regulation of protein targeting to mitochondrion; neutrophil degranulation; induction of bacterial agglutination; defense response to Gram-negative bacterium; defense response to Gram-positive bacterium; RNA phosphodiester bond hydrolysis
Sources:Amigo / QuickGO
Orthologs
Databases	NCBI: entry; OMA: entry
Species	Human	Mouse
Entrez	6036	54159
Ensembl	ENSG00000169385	ENSMUSG00000059606
UniProt	P10153	O35292
RefSeq (mRNA)	NM_002934	NM_019398
RefSeq (protein)	NP_002925	NP_062271
Location (UCSC)	Chr 14: 20.96 – 20.96 Mb	Chr 14: 51.4 – 51.4 Mb
PubMed search
- Wikidata
View/Edit Human	View/Edit Mouse

Eosinophil-derived neurotoxin is an enzyme that in humans is encoded by the RNASE2 gene.

The protein encoded by this gene is found in eosinophil granulocytes. It is closely related to the eosinophil cationic protein (RNASE3) from which it diverged ~50 million years ago after the split between the old world and the new world monkeys. It is relatively neutral and has cytotoxic properties. It is capable of reducing the activity of single strand RNA viruses in culture through its enzymatic activity. It also serves as an attractant to immune cells.

== See also ==
- Ribonuclease A
