= Oxidative folding =

Oxidative protein folding is a process that is responsible for the formation of disulfide bonds between cysteine residues in proteins. The driving force behind this process is a redox reaction, in which electrons pass between several proteins and finally to a terminal electron acceptor.

== In prokaryotes ==
In prokaryotes, the mechanism of oxidative folding is best studied in Gram-negative bacteria. This process is catalysed by protein machinery residing in the periplasmic space of bacteria. The formation of disulfide bonds in a protein is made possible by two related pathways: an oxidative pathway, which is responsible for the formation of the disulfides, and an isomerization pathway that shuffles incorrectly formed disulfides.

== Oxidative pathway ==
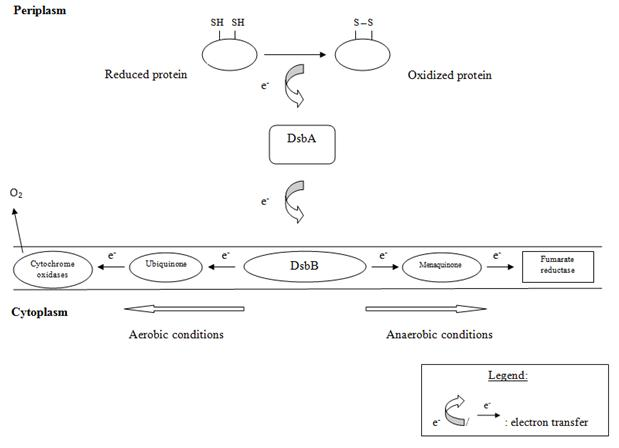
Oxidative pathway in Gram-negative bacteria

The oxidative pathway relies, just like the isomerization pathway, on a protein relay. The first member of this protein relay is a small periplasmic protein (21 kDa) called DsbA, which has two cysteine residues that must be oxidized for it to be active. When in its oxidized state, the protein is able to form disulfide bonds between cysteine residues in newly synthesized, and yet unfolded proteins by the transfer of its own disulfide bond onto the folding protein. After the transfer of this disulfide bond, DsbA is in a reduced state. For it to act catalytically again, it must be reoxidized. This is made possible by a 21 kDa inner membrane protein, called DsbB, which has two pairs of cysteine residues. A mixed disulfide is formed between a cysteine residue of DsbB and one of DsbA. Eventually, this cross-link between the two proteins is broken by a nucleophilic attack of the second cysteine residue in the DsbA active site. On his turn, DsbB is reoxidized by transferring electrons to oxidized ubiquinone, which passes them to cytochrome oxidases, which finally reduce oxygen; this is in aerobic conditions. As molecular oxygen serves as the terminal electron acceptor in aerobic conditions, oxidative folding is conveniently coupled to it through the respiratory chain. In anaerobic conditions however, DsbB passes its electrons to menaquinone, followed by a transfer of electrons to fumarate reductase or nitrate reductase.

== Isomerization pathway ==
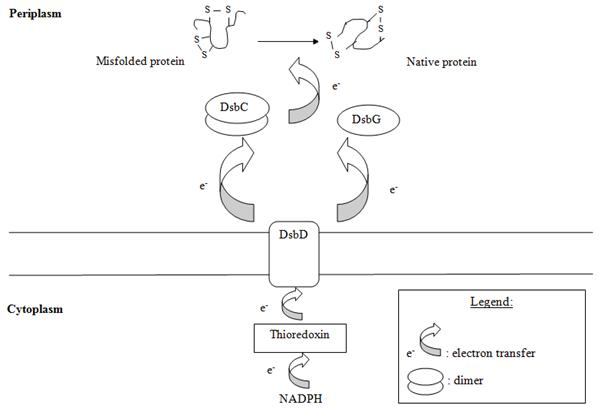
Isomerization pathway in Gram-negative bacteria

Especially for proteins that contain more than one disulfide bond, it is important that incorrect disulfide bonds become rearranged. This is carried out in the isomerization pathway by the protein DsbC, that acts as a disulfide isomerase. DsbC is a dimer, consisting of two identical 23 kDa subunits and has four cysteine residues in each subunit. One of these cysteines (Cys-98) attacks an incorrect disulfide in a misfolded protein and a mixed disulfide is formed between DsbC and this protein. Next, the attack of a second cysteine residue results in the forming of a more stable disulfide in the refolded protein. This may be a cysteine residue either from the earlier misfolded protein or one from DsbC. In the last case, DsbC becomes oxidized and must be reduced in order to play another catalytic role. There is also a second isomerase that can reorganize incorrect disulfide bonds. This protein is called DsbG and it is also a dimer that serves as a chaperone. To fulfil their role as isomerases, DsbC and DsbG must be kept in a reduced state. This is carried out by DsbD, which must be reduced itself to be functional. Thioredoxin, which itself is reduced by thioredoxin reductase and NADPH, ensures the reduction of the DsbD protein.

Because these two pathways coexist next to each other in the same periplasmic compartment, there must be a mechanism to prevent oxidation of DsbC by DsbB. This mechanism indeed exists as DsbB can distinguish between DsbA and DsbC because this latter has the ability to dimerize.

== In eukaryotes ==
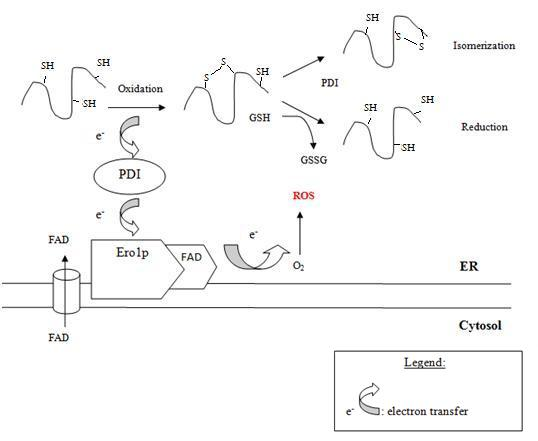
Process of oxidative folding in eukaryotes

A very similar pathway is followed in eukaryotes, in which the protein relay consists of proteins with very analogous properties as those of the protein relay in Gram-negative bacteria. However, a major difference between prokaryotes and eukaryotes is found in the fact that the process of oxidative protein folding occurs in the endoplasmatic reticulum (ER) in eukaryotes. A second difference is that in eukaryotes, the use of molecular oxygen as a terminal electron acceptor is not linked to the process of oxidative folding through the respiratory chain as is the case in bacteria. In fact, one of the proteins involved in the oxidative folding process uses a flavin-dependent reaction to pass electrons directly to molecular oxygen.

A homolog of DsbA, called protein disulfide isomerase (PDI), is responsible for the formation of the disulfide bonds in unfolded eukaryotic proteins. This protein has two thioredoxine-like active sites, which both contain two cysteine residues. By transferring the disulfide bond between these two cysteine residues onto the folding protein it is responsible for the latter's oxidation. In contrast to bacteria, where the oxidative and isomerization pathways are carried out by different proteins, PDI is also responsible for the reduction and isomerization of the disulfide bonds. For PDI to catalyse the formation of disulfide bonds in unfolded proteins, it must be reoxidized. This is carried out by an ER membrane-associated protein, Ero1p, which is no homolog of DsbB. This Ero1p protein forms a mixed disulfide with PDI, which is resolved by a nucleophilic attack of the second cysteine residue in one of the active sites of PDI. As result, oxidized PDI is obtained. Ero1p itself is oxidized by transferring electrons to molecular oxygen. As it is an FAD-binding protein, this transfer of electrons is strongly favoured when Ero1p is bound to FAD. Also a transport system that imports FAD into the ER lumen has been described in eukaryotes. Furthermore, it has been shown that the ability to reduce or rearrange incorrect disulfide bonds in misfolded proteins is provided by the oxidation of reduced glutathione (GSH) to oxidized glutathione (GSSG).

== ROS and diseases ==
Because of the property of Ero1p to transfer electrons directly to molecular oxygen via a flavin-dependent reaction, its activity may produce reactive oxygen species (ROS). In bacteria, this problem is solved by coupling oxidative folding to the respiratory chain. There, the reduction of molecular oxygen to water is carried out by a complex series of proteins, which catalyse this reaction very efficiently. In eukaryotes, the respiratory chain is separated from oxidative folding since cellular respiration takes place in the mitochondria and the formation of disulfide bonds occurs in the ER. Because of this, there is much more risk that ROS are produced in eukaryotic cells during oxidative folding. As is known these ROS may cause many diseases such as atherosclerosis and some neurodegenerative diseases.

== Examples ==
Classical examples of proteins in which the process of oxidative folding is well studied are bovine pancreatic trypsin inhibitor (BPTI) and ribonuclease A (RNaseA). These two proteins have multiple disulfide bonds and so they are very useful to follow and understand the process of oxidative folding. Another example is alkaline phosphatase, which contains two essential disulfides. It was used as an indicator protein to screen the effect of mutations in DsbA.
