= Ribonuclease inhibitor =

Leucine Rich Repeat
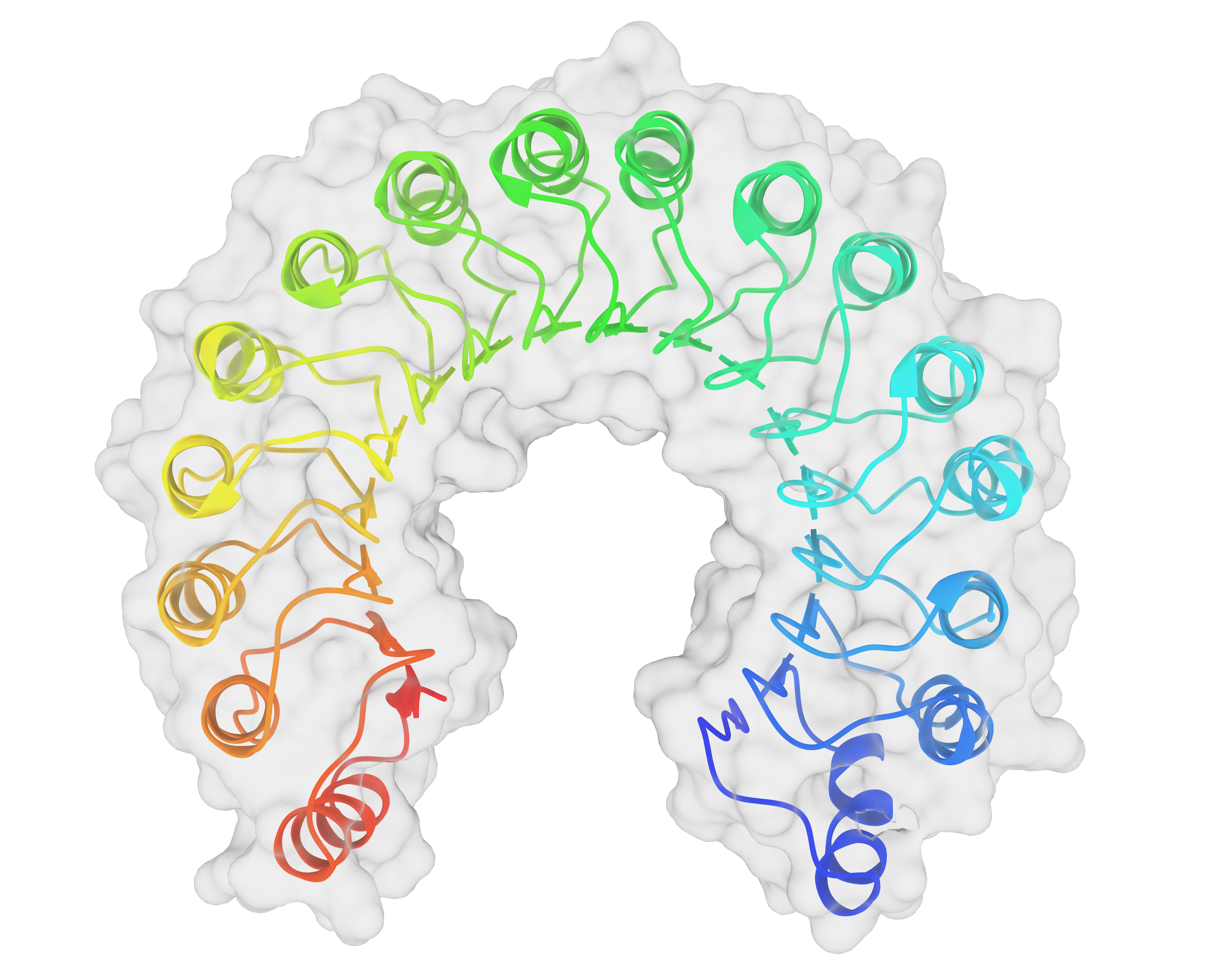
- Top view of porcine ribonuclease inhibitor, showing its horseshoe shape. The outer layer is composed of α-helices and the inner layer of parallel β-strands. The inner and outer diameters are roughly 2.1 nm and 6.7 nm, respectively.

Identifiers
- Symbol: LRR_1
- Pfam: PF00560
- Pfam clan: CL0022
- InterPro: IPR003590
- SMART: SM00368
- SCOP2: 1bnh / SCOPe / SUPFAM
Available protein structures:
- PDB: 1a4y, 1dfj, 1z7x, 2bex, 2bnh, 2q4g IPR003590 PF00560 (ECOD; PDBsum)
- AlphaFold: IPR003590; PF00560

Ribonuclease inhibitor (RI) is a large (~450 residues, ~49 kDa), acidic (pI ~4.7), leucine-rich repeat protein that forms extremely tight complexes with certain ribonucleases.

RI has a surprisingly high cysteine content (~6.5%, cf. 1.7% in typical proteins) and is sensitive to oxidation. RI is also rich in leucine (21.5%, compared to 9% in typical proteins) and commensurately lower in other hydrophobic residues, esp. valine, isoleucine, methionine, tyrosine, and phenylalanine.

== Structure ==
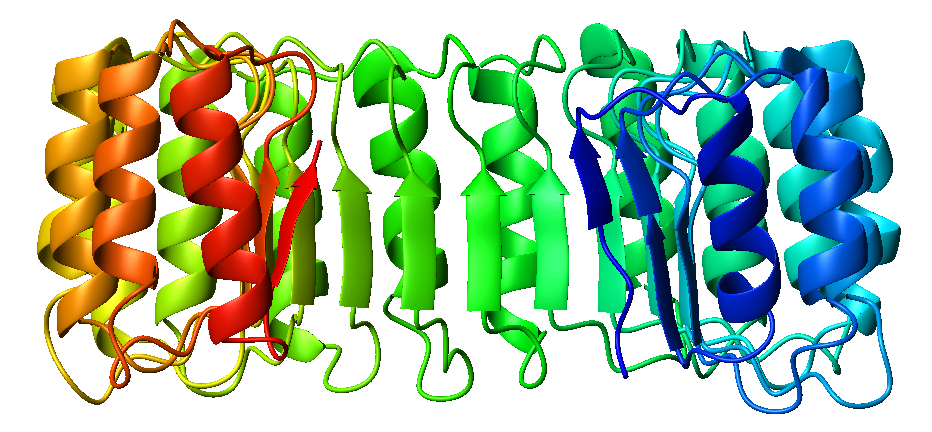
Side view of porcine ribonuclease inhibitor; ribbon is colored from blue (N-terminus) to red (C-terminus).

RI is the classic leucine-rich repeat protein, consisting of alternating α-helices and β-strands along its backbone. These secondary structure elements wrap around in a curved, right-handed solenoid that resembles a horseshoe. The parallel β-strands and α-helices form the inner and outer wall of the horseshoe, respectively. The structure appears to be stabilized by buried asparagines at the base of each turn, as it passes from α-helix to β-strand. The αβ repeats alternate between 28 and 29 residues in length, effectively forming a 57-residue unit that corresponds to its genetic structure (each exon codes for a 57-residue unit).

== Binding to ribonucleases ==
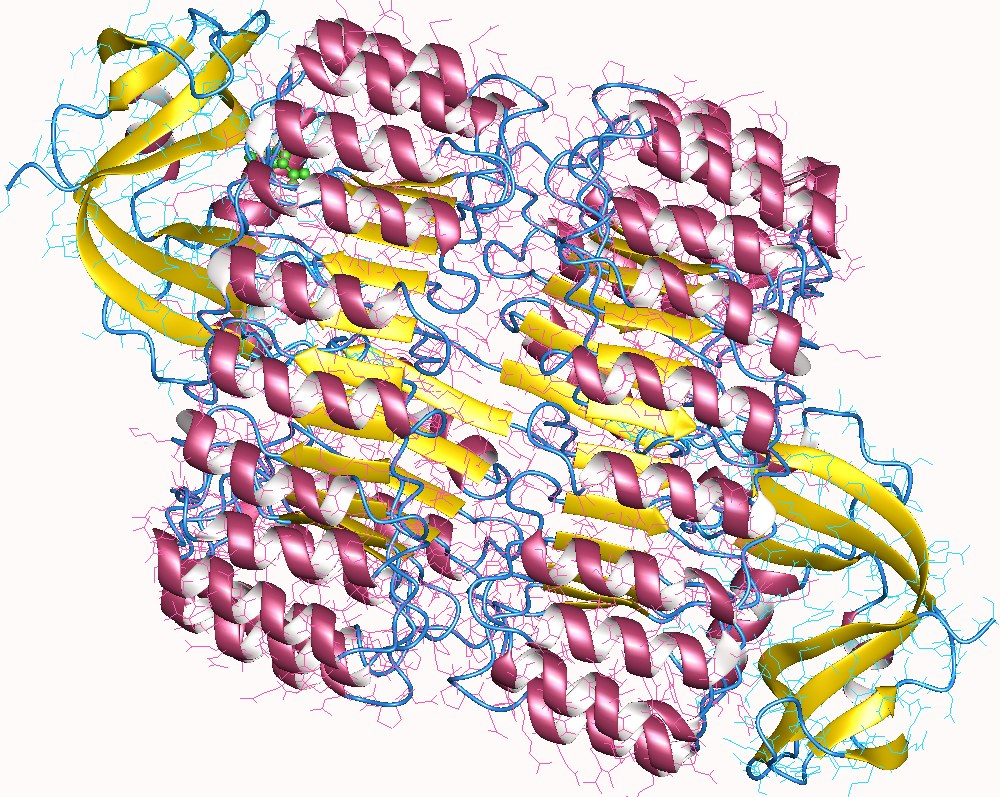
Ribonuclease I (yellow) and inhibitor (pink helixes) complex heterotetramer, Human.

The affinity of RI for ribonucleases is among the highest for any protein-protein interaction; the dissociation constant of the RI-RNase A complex is in the femtomolar (fM) range under physiological conditions. Despite this high affinity, RI is able to bind a wide variety of RNases A despite their relatively low sequence identity. Both biochemical studies and crystallographic structures of RI-RNase A complexes suggest that the interaction is governed largely by electrostatic interactions, but also involves substantial buried surface area. RI's affinity for ribonucleases is important, since many ribonucleases have cytotoxic and cytostatic effects that correlate well with ability to bind RI.

Mammalian RIs are unable to bind certain pancreatic ribonuclease family members from other species. In particular, amphibian RNases, such ranpirnase and amphinase from the Northern leopard frog, escape mammalian RI and have been noted to have differential cytotoxicity against cancer cells.

== See also ==
- Guanidinium thiocyanate - a chemical RNase inhibitor.
