= Pancreatic ribonuclease family =

Class of enzymes

Pancreatic ribonuclease
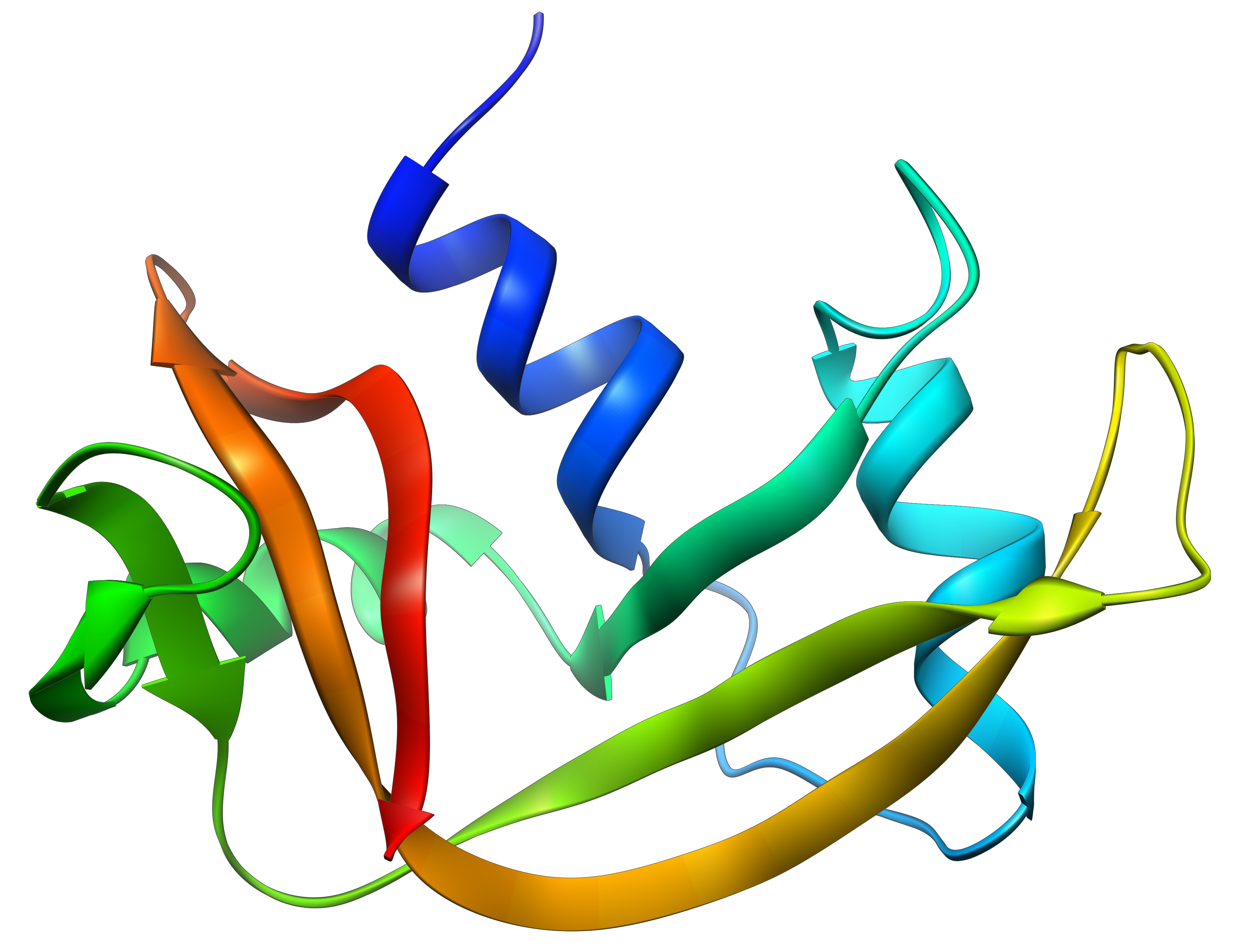
- Structure of RNase A

Identifiers
- EC no.: 4.6.1.18
- CAS no.: 9001-99-4

Databases
- BRENDA: enzyme data
- ExPASy: NiceZyme view
- KEGG: enzyme entry
- MetaCyc: metabolic pathway
- Rhea: reactions
- PDB structures: RCSB PDB PDBe PDBsum
- Gene Ontology: AmiGO / QuickGO
Search
- PMC: articles
- PubMed: articles
- NCBI: proteins

Pancreatic ribonuclease

Identifiers
- Symbol: RNaseA
- Pfam: PF00074
- InterPro: IPR001427
- SMART: SM00092
- PROSITE: PDOC00118
Available protein structures:
- PDB: PDB: 11ba PDB: 11bg PDB: 1a2w PDB: 1a4y PDB: 1a5p PDB: 1a5q PDB: 1afk PDB: 1afl PDB: 1afu PDB: 1agi IPR001427 PF00074 (ECOD; PDBsum)
- AlphaFold: IPR001427; PF00074

Pancreatic ribonuclease family (EC 4.6.1.18, RNase, RNase I, RNase A, pancreatic RNase, ribonuclease I, endoribonuclease I, ribonucleic phosphatase, alkaline ribonuclease, ribonuclease, gene S glycoproteins, Ceratitis capitata alkaline ribonuclease, SLSG glycoproteins, gene S locus-specific glycoproteins, S-genotype-assocd. glycoproteins, ribonucleate 3'-pyrimidino-oligonucleotidohydrolase) is a superfamily of pyrimidine-specific endonucleases found in high quantity in the pancreas of certain mammals and of some reptiles.

Specifically, the enzymes are involved in endonucleolytic cleavage of 3'-phosphomononucleotides and 3'-phosphooligonucleotides ending in C-P or U-P with 2',3'-cyclic phosphate intermediates. Ribonuclease can unwind the RNA helix by complexing with single-stranded RNA; the complex arises by an extended multi-site cation-anion interaction between lysine and arginine residues of the enzyme and phosphate groups of the nucleotides.

== Notable family members ==
Bovine pancreatic ribonuclease is the best-studied member of the family and has served as a model system in work related to protein folding, disulfide bond formation, protein crystallography and spectroscopy, and protein dynamics. The human genome contains 8 genes that share the structure and function with bovine pancreatic ribonuclease, with 5 additional pseudo-genes. The structure and dynamics of these enzymes are related to their diverse biological functions.

Other proteins belonging to the pancreatic ribonuclease superfamily include: bovine seminal vesicle like Seminal RNase and brain ribonucleases; kidney non-secretory ribonucleases; liver-type ribonucleases; angiogenin, which induces vascularisation of normal and malignant tissues; eosinophil cationic protein, a cytotoxin and helminthotoxin with ribonuclease activity; and frog liver ribonuclease and frog sialic acid-binding lectin. The sequence of pancreatic ribonucleases contains four conserved disulfide bonds and three amino acid residues involved in the catalytic activity.

== Human genes ==
Human genes encoding proteins containing this domain include:

- ANG,
- RNASE1, RNASE2, RNASE3, RNASE4, RNASE6, RNASE7, RNASE8, RNASE10, and RNASE12.

== Cytotoxicity ==
Some members of the pancreatic ribonuclease family have cytotoxic effects. Mammalian cells are protected from these effects due to their extremely high affinity for ribonuclease inhibitor (RI), which protects cellular RNA from degradation by pancreatic ribonucleases. Pancreatic ribonucleases that are not inhibited by RI are approximately as toxic as alpha-sarcin, diphtheria toxin, or ricin.

Two pancreatic ribonucleases isolated from the oocytes of the Northern leopard frog - amphinase and ranpirnase - are not inhibited by RI and show differential cytotoxicity against tumor cells. Ranpirnase was studied in a Phase III clinical trial as a treatment candidate for mesothelioma, but the trial did not demonstrate statistical significance against primary endpoints.
