= Ranpirnase =

Enzyme from the northern leopard frog

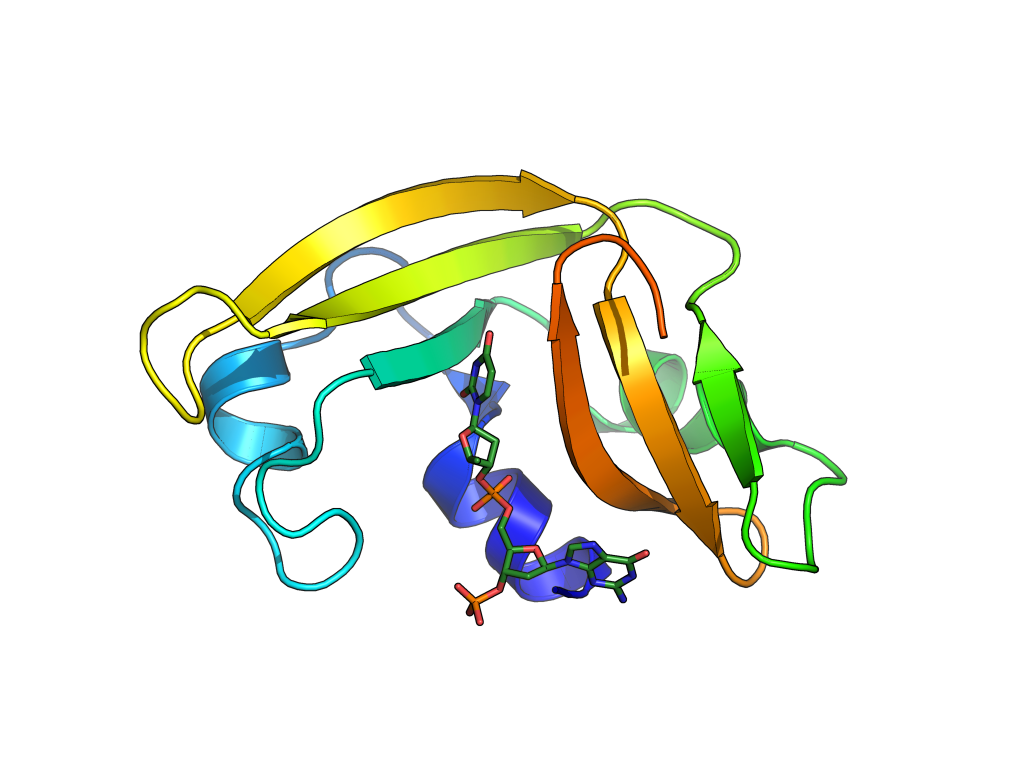
- Crystallographic structure of ranpirnase in complex with RNA.

Identifiers
- Organism: Rana pipiens
- Symbol: n/a
- Orthologs: OMA: entry
- PDB: 2I5S
- UniProt: P85073

Other data
- EC number: 4.6.1.18
Search for
- Structures: Swiss-model
- Domains: InterPro

Ranpirnase is a ribonuclease enzyme found in the oocytes of the northern leopard frog (Rana pipiens). Ranpirnase is a member of the pancreatic ribonuclease (RNase A) protein superfamily and degrades RNA substrates with a sequence preference for uracil and guanine nucleotides. Along with amphinase, another leopard frog ribonuclease, Ranpirnase has been studied as a potential cancer and antiviral treatment due to its unusual mechanism of cytotoxicity tested against transformed cells and antiviral activity.

Ranpirnase was originally discovered by scientists at TamirBio, a biotechnology company (formerly Alfacell Corporation), where it was tested in preclinical assays and in clinical trials under the name Pannon or Onconase, and TMR004. The mechanism of action of ranpirnase has been attributed to the RNA interference pathway, potentially through cleaving siRNA molecules; to cleavage of transfer RNA; and to interference with the NF-κB pathway. Currently (as of March 2020) Ranpirnase is in clinical trials as a potential antiviral.

== EC number ==
The EC system, or enzyme classification system was created to both standardize enzyme names, as well as allow for association of enzyme reaction type and function. The EC number for Ranpirnase is EC 4.6.1.18, but was previously EC 3.1.27.5. This means that ranpirnase is in class 4, subclass 6, sub-subclass 1, and serial #18. Class 4 are considered lyases, while subclass 4.6.1 further classifies the enzyme as a phosphorus-oxygen lyase. Ultimately, ranpirnase can be classified as a pancreatic ribonuclease.

== Reaction pathway ==
The reaction pathway of ranpirnase is initiated by the enzyme adhering to the surface of the targeted cell. Ranpirnase then penetrates and enters the cell through energy-dependent endocytosis. Once in the cell, ranpirnase is directed via the Golgi apparatus to the cytosol, where the enzyme then can selectively break down tRNA, while ignoring rRNA and mRNA. Ranpirnase degrades tRNA by facilitating the cleavage of the P-O5’ bond found in RNA, specifically on the 3’ side of pyrimidine nucleosides. As a result of this RNA degradation process, protein synthesis is hindered. This inhibition of protein synthesis contributes to the cytostatic and cytotoxic effects of ranpirnase.

== Structure ==
Ranpirnase is found in the oocytes of Rana pipiens, also known as the northern leopard frog. These oocytes have two similar variations of pancreatic ribonuclease A, which both exhibit cytostatic and cytotoxic properties. Ranpirnase contains 104 amino acid residues, making it the smallest identified member of the RNase A superfamily. Overall, ranpirnase is considered small single chain protein that has a molecular weight around 12,000 Da. Once ranpirnase was isolated from the oocytes, it was discovered that ranpirnase is polymorphic at amino acid position 25. Specifically, this position has historically been occupied by Thr amino acids, but Ser amino acids have also been identified. This replacement, however, does not appear to change the function of the enzyme. Additionally, ranpirnase contains 4 disulfide bonds that give the enzyme high heat stability.

== Function ==
Once in the cell, ranpirnase plays both a cytostatic and cytotoxic role. Cytostatically, ranpirnase halts the cell cycle in G1, but simultaneously acts as a cytotoxin. There is evidence indicating that the damage caused to tRNA is irreversible and can serve as a pro-apoptotic signal, however this appears to be dependent on additional enzymes that assist in programmed cell death. Ranpirnase appears to be most active and effective against tumor cells compared to normal cells. Within these tumor cells, ranpirnase activates a signal-transduction pathway called stress-activated protein kinase or SAPK. SAPK1 contains JNK-1 and -2 alleles that are targeted and disturbed by ranpirnase. These JNKs play a significant role as moderators of the cytotoxic effects induced by ranpirnase. Ultimately, ranpirnase appears to be more apoptotic in cancer cells due to the induction of multiple pro-apoptotic pathways.

== Known crystal structures ==
The crystal structure of ranpirnase contains a segment that encompasses the beginning of a helix. This is where the main chain assumes a strained conformation leading to noticeable deviations from planarity within the peptide bonds of this enzyme. Specifically, the peptide bonds of Ser39, Arg40, and Pro41 experience ω dihedral angles of 160.0, 192.1, and 193.5°, respectively. The orientations of the side chains of Arg40 and Glu42 are clearly defined, and Arg40's guanidino group aligns itself with a sulfate ion.

== Known active sites ==
Ranpirnase's active site encompasses a catalytic triad that commonly found in the RNase A superfamily. This catalytic triad consists of His10, Lys31, and His97. In addition to the common catalytic triad, ranpirnase has two extra active-site residues: Lys9 and an N-terminal pyroglutamate residue. These additional active sites are created within the endoplasmic reticulum through the co-translational cyclization of its encoded glutamine.

== Structure tied to function ==
The structure of ranpirnase does appear to have an impact on its function. Specifically, studies suggest that ranpirnase uses Coulombic interactions as well as a hydrogen bonding system to adjust substrate specificity. Additionally, it has been seen that intentional changes in amino acid replacements can also modify substrate specificity. Studies have also investigated the structural characteristics that underlie the reduced catalytic activity of ranpirnase. This decreased catalytic activity is associated with low affinity for substrate. A solution to this appears to be undergoing T5R substitution. A T5R substitution is engineered to establish a successful Coulombic interaction between ranpirnase and a phosphoryl group in RNA. This then resulted in a twofold enhancement of ribonucleolytic activity.
