= Eosinophil cationic protein =

Mammalian protein found in Homo sapiens

RNASE3
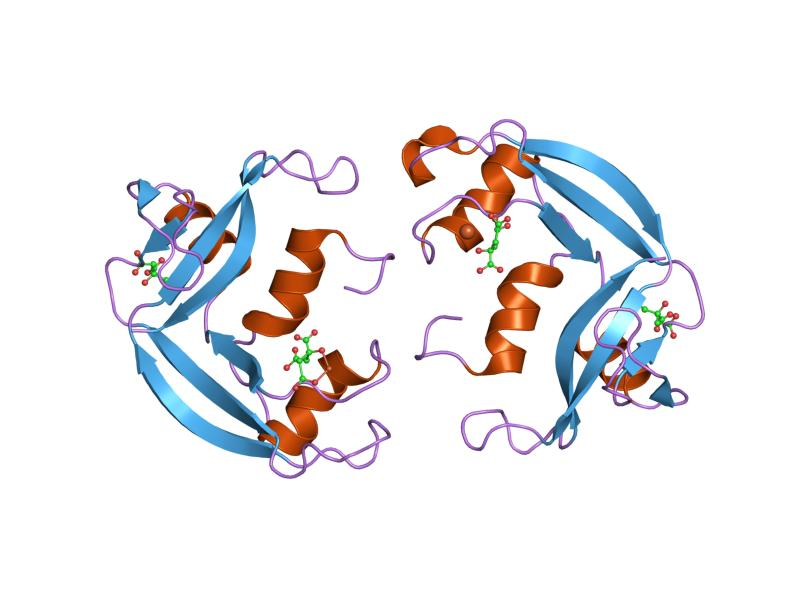

Identifiers
- Aliases: RNASE3, ECP, RNS3, RAF1, ribonuclease A family member 3
- External IDs: OMIM: 131398; MGI: 3528616; GeneCards: RNASE3
Available structures
PDB	Ortholog search: PDBe RCSB
PDB	List of PDB id codes 4A2O, 4X08, 1DYT, 4OXB, 2LVZ, 2KB5, 4OXF, 1QMT, 4OWZ, 1H1H, 4A2Y

Gene location (Human)
Chr.	Chromosome 14 (human)
Band	14q11.2	Start	20,891,385 bp
Band	14q11.2	End	20,892,348 bp
RNA expression pattern
Bgee	Human / Mouse (ortholog); Top expressed in: trabecular bone; bone marrow; bone marrow cell; testicle; mononuclear cell; monocyte; blood; granulocyte; spleen; gonad / n/a; More reference expression data
BioGPS	n/a
Gene ontology
Molecular function	nuclease activity; endonuclease activity; ribonuclease activity; hydrolase activity; nucleic acid binding; lipopolysaccharide binding
Cellular component	extracellular region; extracellular space; azurophil granule lumen
Biological process	RNA catabolic process; innate immune response in mucosa; defense response to bacterium; nucleic acid phosphodiester bond hydrolysis; RNA phosphodiester bond hydrolysis; antimicrobial humoral response; neutrophil degranulation; antimicrobial humoral immune response mediated by antimicrobial peptide; innate immune response
Sources:Amigo / QuickGO
Orthologs
Databases	NCBI: entry; OMA: entry
Species	Human	Mouse
Entrez	6037	503847
Ensembl	ENSG00000169397	ENSMUSG00000050766
UniProt	P12724	Q5GAN2
RefSeq (mRNA)	NM_002935	NM_017389
RefSeq (protein)	NP_002926	NP_059085
Location (UCSC)	Chr 14: 20.89 – 20.89 Mb	n/a
PubMed search
- Wikidata
View/Edit Human	View/Edit Mouse

Eosinophil cationic protein (ECP) also known as ribonuclease 3 is a basic protein located in the eosinophil primary matrix. In humans, the eosinophil cationic protein is encoded by the RNASE3 gene.

ECP is released during degranulation of eosinophils. This protein is related to inflammation and asthma because in these cases, there are increased levels of ECP in the body. There are three glycosylated forms of ECP and consequently ECP has a range of molecular weights from 18 to 22 kDa.

== Function ==
Eosinophil cationic protein and the sequence related eosinophil-derived neurotoxin (RNASE2) are both members of the Ribonuclease A superfamily. Both proteins possess neurotoxic, helmintho-toxic, and ribonucleo-lytic activities. Eosinophil cationic protein is localized to the granule matrix of the eosinophil.

== Ribonuclease activity and cytotoxicity ==
The ribonuclease activity of ECP is not essential for cytotoxicity.

When the two known ribonuclease active-site residues are modified to non-functional counterparts (Lysine at position 38 to Arginine and Histidine at position 128 to Aspartate) and compared to the wild-type ECP, the mutated ECP retains its cytotoxicity but no longer has its ribonuclease activity. The experiment confirmed that converting the two amino acids to non-functional counterparts did inhibit ECP's ribonuclease activity. However, ECP retained its anti-parasitic activity. Also, it did not change the production and transportation of ECP in bacteria.

ECP is a potent cytotoxic protein capable of killing cells of guinea pig tracheal epithelium, mammalian leukemia, epidermis carcinoma, and breast carcinoma, as well as non-mammalian cells such as parasites, bacteria, and viruses.

Mature ECP is cytotoxic to human bronchial epithelial (BEAS-2B) cells by specific binding to cell surface heparan sulfate proteoglycans (HSPGs) followed by endocytosis.

== ECP-induced apoptosis ==
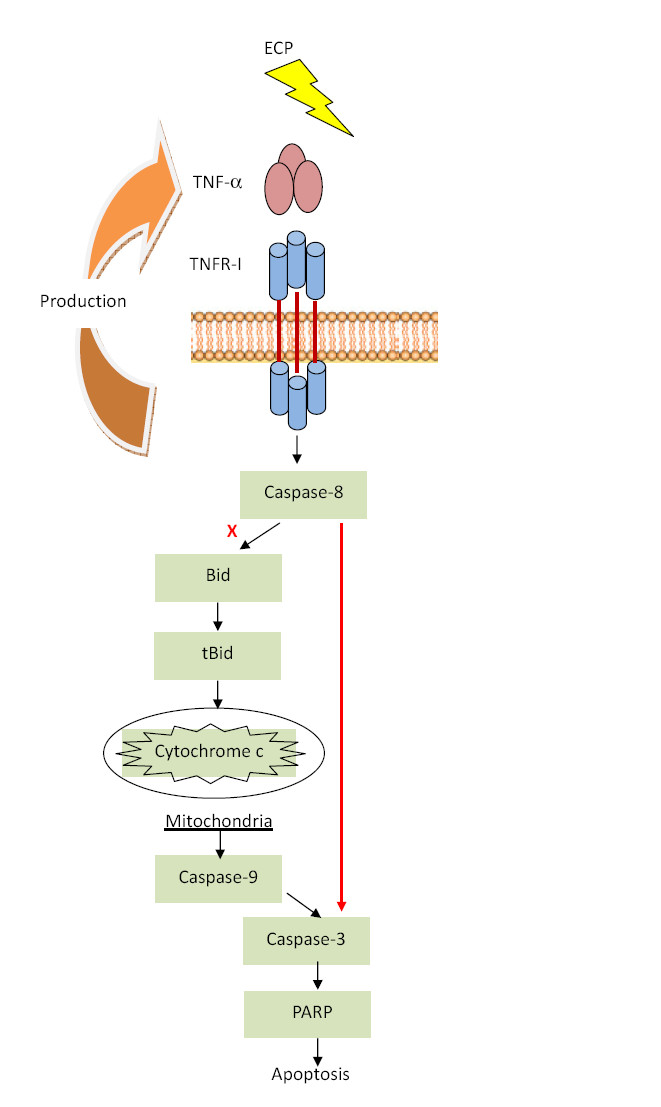
Role of rECP in TNF-α apoptosis signaling. rECP increases BEAS-2B cells TNF-α production and release. The release of TNF-α binding to TNF receptor results in receptor internalization and activates caspase-8. Caspase-8-induced apoptosis can either trigger mitochondrial response or directly cause PARP activation by caspase-3. However, rECP-induced apoptosis shows no effects on mitochondrial responses. Accordingly, we suggest that rECP induces mitochondria-independent apoptosis.

Studies show that ECP, along with other RNases including EDN, had been reported to induce apoptosis in cells. A latest study indicated that ECP caused cytotoxicity in HL-60 and HeLa cells via caspase-3 like activity. Accordingly, cytotoxic RNases play an important role in cell death. However, the mechanism of ECP-induced apoptosis is still not fully verified. Recent studies have shown that eosinophils can induce epithelial cell death via apoptosis and necrosis.

ECP triggers apoptosis by caspase-8 activation through mitochondria-independent pathway. Increases in chromatin condensation, sub-G1 population, PARP cleavage, and DNA fragmentation indicate that ECP induces apoptosis in human bronchial epithelial (BEAS-2B) cells.

== Clinical significance ==
Eosinophil granulocytes appear in large numbers in inflammation sites and in response to certain parasitic infections. These cytoplasmic granules contain positively charged proteins that characterize the cells. ECP is one of the four highly basic proteins that enter the surrounding tissues when activated eosinophils degranulate. Although circulating ECP levels can vary widely among patients, some studies show that serum ECP measurements are useful in monitoring many active inflammatory diseases. ECP concentrations in plasma and other body fluids increase during inflammatory reactions marked by activated eosinophils.

Serum ECP levels are also a useful, objective measurement for asthma severity. Increased ECP levels correspond to symptom onset. In seasonal asthmatic patients, ECP measurement reflected changes in disease activity throughout the year.

There are several mechanisms that can be combined to generate an asthma attack, including specific IgE antibodies, activated inflammatory cells, neurogenic mechanisms, hyperresponsiveness and individual hormonal imbalances. Allergic reactions in the lung typically have two phases. The late phase typically occurs several hours after exposure, upon which eosinophils accumulate in the bronchus and release granule proteins that cause bronchial irritability. ECP is also toxic to neurons, some epithelial cell lines, and isolated myocardial cells. This could be a reason for itching disorders of the skin.

Serum ECP concentrations have also been linked to atopic dermatitis (AD) activity. ECP correlates with the symptoms (lichenification, sleep deprivation, erythema, papules, pruritus and excoriations) for AD and also correlates with the total clinical score.

Serum ECP measurement for assessing asthma severity, monitoring therapy, and indicating severity of certain inflammatory skin conditions present an advantage over subjective clinical measures that are prone to inconsistencies due to broad variability of individual investigator and patient assessments, especially in young children.

The normal reference range for blood tests for eosinophil cationic protein is between 2.3 and 16 μg/L.

== See also ==
- Ribonuclease A
