= Disulfide bridge =

Structural element of proteins

Schematic of disulfide bonds crosslinking regions of a protein

A disulfide bridge or disulfide bond (disulphide in British English) is a type of structural connection found in proteins which contains a pair of covalently bonded sulfur atoms. Also called SS-bonds, they are typically found connecting pairs of cysteines via the sulfur atoms in their side chains. They are a common type of post-translational modification, and are an important component of the tertiary and quaternary structure of many proteins. They are similar to organic disulfides in their structure.

== Appearance in proteins ==
Disulfide bonds form from thiols (such as those in cysteine residues) under oxidising conditions. They play an important role in the folding and stability of some proteins, usually proteins secreted to the extracellular medium. Since most cellular compartments are reducing environments, in general, disulfide bonds are unstable in the cytosol, with some exceptions as noted below, unless a sulfhydryl oxidase is present.

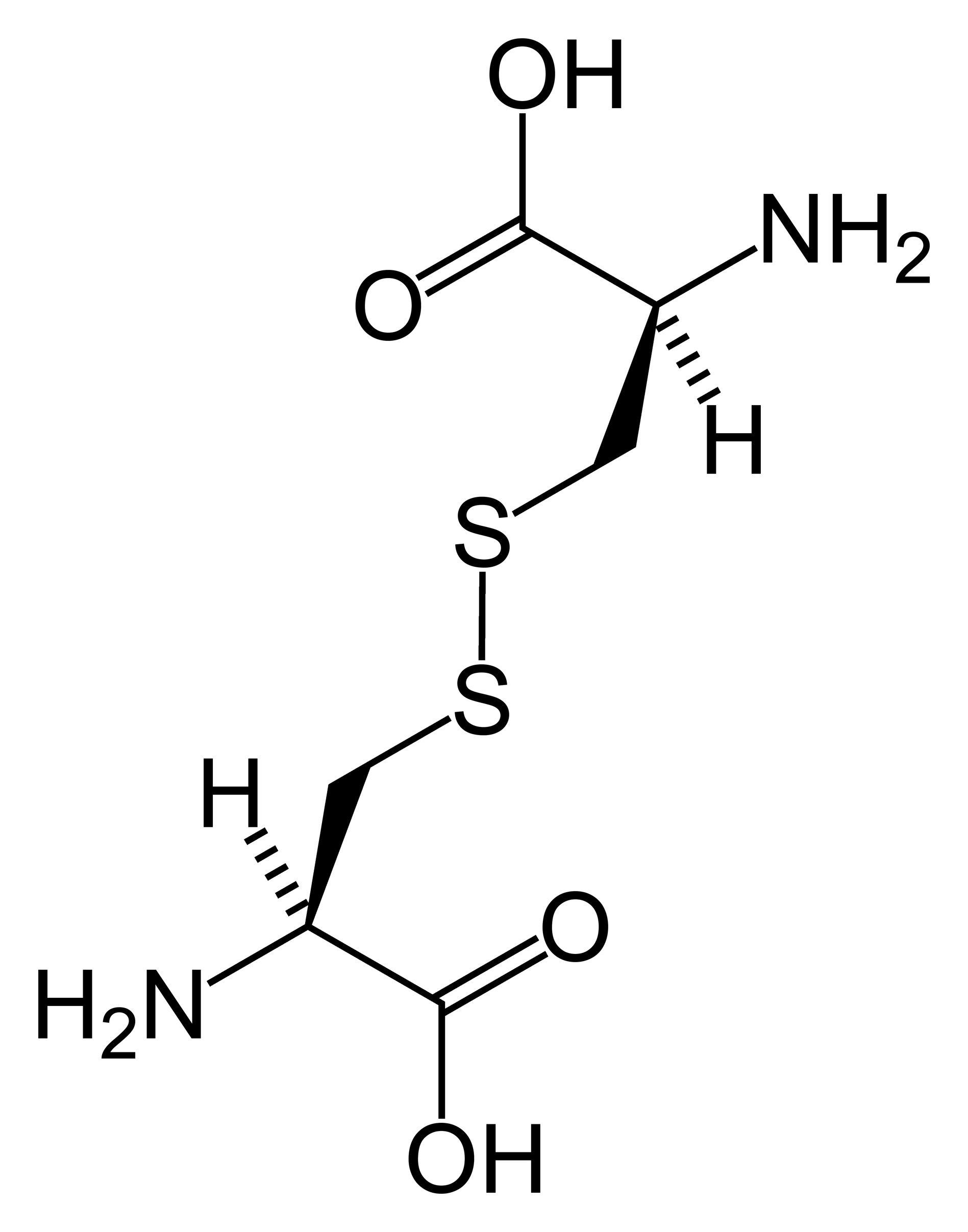
Cystine is composed of two cysteines linked by a disulfide bond (shown here in its neutral form).

Disulfide bonds in proteins are formed between the thiol groups of cysteine residues by the process of oxidative folding. The other sulfur-containing amino acid, methionine, cannot form disulfide bonds. A disulfide bond is typically denoted by hyphenating the abbreviations for cysteine, e.g., when referring to ribonuclease A the "Cys26–Cys84 disulfide bond", or the "26–84 disulfide bond", or most simply as "C26–C84" where the disulfide bond is understood and does not need to be mentioned. The prototype of a protein disulfide bond is the two-amino-acid peptide cystine, which is composed of two cysteine amino acids joined by a disulfide bond. The structure of a disulfide bond can be described by its χ_{ss} dihedral angle between the C^{β}−S^{γ}−S^{γ}−C^{β} atoms, which is usually close to ±90°.

The disulfide bond stabilizes the folded form of a protein in several ways:

1. It holds two portions of the protein together, biasing the protein towards a particular the folded topology. That is, the disulfide bond destabilizes the unfolded form of the protein by lowering its entropy.
2. The disulfide bond may form the nucleus of a hydrophobic core of the folded protein, i.e., local hydrophobic residues may condense around the disulfide bond and onto each other through hydrophobic interactions.
3. Related to 1 and 2, the disulfide bond links two segments of the protein chain, increases the effective local concentration of protein residues, and decreases the effective local concentration of water molecules. Since water can attack amide-amide hydrogen bonds and break up secondary structure, a disulfide bond stabilizes secondary structure in its vicinity. en them.

Over 90% of the dry weight of hair comprises proteins called keratins, which have a high disulfide content, from the amino acid cysteine. The robustness conferred in part by disulfide linkages is illustrated by the recovery of virtually intact hair from ancient Egyptian tombs. Feathers have similar keratins and are extremely resistant to protein digestive enzymes. The stiffness of hair and feather is determined by the disulfide content. Manipulating disulfide bonds in hair is the basis for the permanent wave in hairstyling. Reagents that affect the making and breaking of S−S bonds are key, e.g., ammonium thioglycolate. The high disulfide content of feathers dictates the high sulfur content of bird eggs. The high sulfur content of hair and feathers contributes to the disagreeable odor that results when they are burned.

=== Establishing disulfide position within protein chain ===
Multiple ways allow establishing how many and where do disulfide bridges appear within a given peptide or protein. Free cysteine residues can be selectively marked upon denaturation of the protein. Mass spectrometry can then be used to establish where these cysteines are. Mass spectrometry can also be used to determine the presence of disulfide bridges, because they are not fragmented under certain conditions. Proteins can thus be selectively cleaved in certain positions in order to find the positions of the disulfides.

== Occurrence ==
=== In bacteria and archaea ===
Disulfide bonds play an important protective role for bacteria as a reversible switch that turns a protein on or off when bacterial cells are exposed to oxidation reactions. Hydrogen peroxide (H_{2}O_{2}) in particular could severely damage DNA and kill the bacterium at low concentrations if not for the protective action of the SS-bond. Archaea typically have fewer disulfides than higher organisms.

=== In eukaryotes ===
In eukaryotic cells, in general, stable disulfide bonds are formed in the lumen of the RER (rough endoplasmic reticulum) and the mitochondrial intermembrane space but not in the cytosol. This is due to the more oxidizing environment of the aforementioned compartments and more reducing environment of the cytosol (see glutathione). Thus disulfide bonds are mostly found in secretory proteins, lysosomal proteins, and the exoplasmic domains of membrane proteins.

There are notable exceptions to this rule. For example, many nuclear and cytosolic proteins can become disulfide-crosslinked during necrotic cell death. Similarly, a number of cytosolic proteins which have cysteine residues in proximity to each other that function as oxidation sensors or redox catalysts; when the reductive potential of the cell fails, they oxidize and trigger cellular response mechanisms. The virus Vaccinia also produces cytosolic proteins and peptides that have many disulfide bonds; although the reason for this is unknown. Presumably they have protective effects against intracellular proteolytic machinery.

Disulfide bonds are also formed within and between protamines in the sperm chromatin of many mammalian species.

== Disulfides in regulatory proteins ==
The redox state of S-S bonds has evolved into a signaling element. In chloroplasts, for example, the reduction of disulfide bonds is linked to numerous metabolic pathways as well as gene expression. The reductive signaling activity is carried by the ferredoxin-thioredoxin system, channeling electrons from the light reactions of photosystem I to the S-S bonds in the regulated proteins in a light dependent manner. In this way chloroplasts adjust the activity of the Calvin–Benson cycle, starch degradation, ATP production and gene expression according to light intensity.

Disulfides plays a significant role on redox state regulation of Two-component systems (TCSs), which could be found in certain bacteria including photogenic strain. A unique intramolecular cysteine disulfide bonds in the ATP-binding domain of SrrAB TCs found in Staphylococcus aureus is example of disulfides in regulatory proteins, which the redox state of SrrB molecule is controlled by cysteine disulfide bonds, leading to the modification of SrrA activity including gene regulation.

Protein S-glutathionylation to give a mixed disulfide is posttranslational modification of protein cysteine residues.

== Thiol–disulfide exchange ==
Thiol–disulfide exchange is the principal reaction by which disulfide bonds are formed and rearranged in a protein. The rearrangement of disulfide bonds within a protein generally occurs via intra-protein thiol–disulfide exchange reactions; a thiolate group of a cysteine residue attacks one of the protein's own disulfide bonds. This process of disulfide rearrangement (known as disulfide shuffling) does not change the number of disulfide bonds within a protein, merely their location (i.e., which cysteines are bonded). Disulfide reshuffling is generally much faster than oxidation/reduction reactions, which change the number of disulfide bonds within a protein. The oxidation and reduction of protein disulfide bonds in vitro also generally occurs via thiol–disulfide exchange reactions. Typically, the thiolate of a redox reagent such as glutathione, dithiothreitol attacks the disulfide bond on a protein forming a mixed disulfide bond between the protein and the reagent. This mixed disulfide bond when attacked by another thiolate from the reagent, leaves the cysteine oxidized. In effect, the disulfide bond is transferred from the protein to the reagent in two steps, both thiol–disulfide exchange reactions.

Focusing in some jargon, a disulfide species is a particular pairing of cysteines in a disulfide-bonded protein and is usually depicted by listing the disulfide bonds in parentheses, e.g., the "(26–84, 58–110) disulfide species". A disulfide ensemble is a grouping of all disulfide species with the same number of disulfide bonds, and is usually denoted as the 1S ensemble, the 2S ensemble, etc. for disulfide species having one, two, etc. disulfide bonds. Thus, the (26–84) disulfide species belongs to the 1S ensemble, whereas the (26–84, 58–110) species belongs to the 2S ensemble. The single species with no disulfide bonds is usually denoted as R for "fully reduced".

The native form of protein is usually a single disulfide species, although some proteins may cycle between a few disulfide states as part of their function, e.g., thioredoxin. In proteins with more than two cysteines, non-native disulfide species may be formed, which are almost always misfolded. As the number of cysteines increases, the number of nonnative species grows factorially.

The in vivo oxidation and reduction of protein disulfide bonds by thiol–disulfide exchange is facilitated by thioredoxin. This small protein, essential in all known organisms, contains two cysteine amino acid residues in a vicinal arrangement (i.e., next to each other), which allows it to form an internal disulfide bond, or disulfide bonds with other proteins. As such, it can be used as a repository of reduced or oxidized disulfide bond moieties.

Thiol–disulfide exchange showing the linear intermediate in which the charge is shared among the three sulfur atoms. The thiolate group (shown in red) attacks a sulfur atom (shown in blue) of the disulfide bond, displacing the other sulfur atom (shown in green) and forming a new disulfide bond.

=== Commonly used reagents ===
In some cases, certain cysteine residues might undergo an unwanted oxidation to form disulfide bridges. This can be reversed by the use of thiols such as β-mercaptoethanol (β-ME) or dithiothreitol (DTT) serve as reductants through thiol-disulfide exchange. These reagents are used in excess to drive the following equilibrium towards the products:

RS—SR + 2 HOCH_{2}CH_{2}SH ⇌ HOCH_{2}CH_{2}S—SCH_{2}CH_{2}OH + 2 RSH

tTris(2-carboxyethyl)phosphine (TCEP) can also be used. It is odorless, unlike β-ME and DTT, and it is selective, works at both alkaline and acidic conditions (unlike DTT), it is more hydrophilic and more resistant to oxidation in air. Furthermore, it is often not needed to remove TCEP before modification of protein thiols.

== Clinical importance ==
Cystinosis is a condition where cystine precipitates in various organs. This accumulation interferes with bodily function and can be fatal. This disorder can be resolved by treatment with cysteamine. Cysteamine functions by the converting the symmetrical disulfide cystine to a more soluble mixed disulfide and cysteine:

(SCH_{2}CH(NH_{3})CO^{−}_{2})_{2} + HSCH_{2}CH_{2}NH_{2} → H_{2}NCH_{2}CH_{2}SSCH_{2}CH(NH_{3})CO^{−}_{2} + HSCH_{2}CH(NH_{3})CO^{−}_{2}
