= Amphinase =

Northern leopard frog enzyme

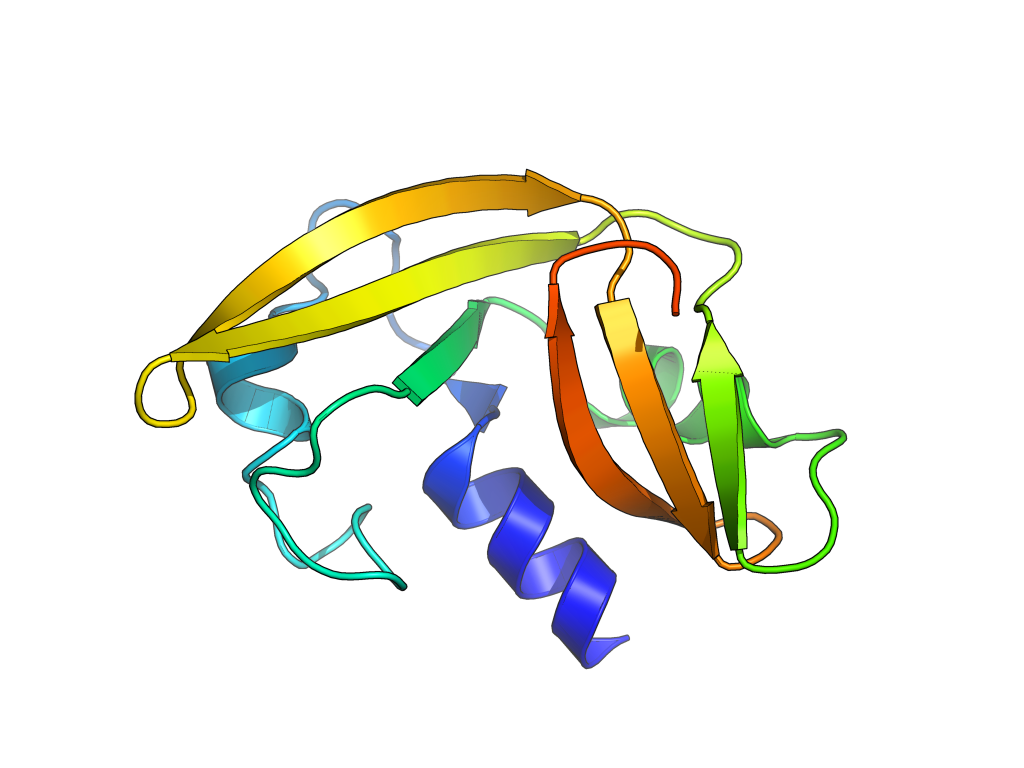
- Crystallographic structure of amphinase.

Identifiers
- Organism: Rana pipiens
- Symbol: n/a
- Orthologs: OMA: entry
- PDB: 2P7S
- UniProt: P85073

Other data
- EC number: 3.1.27
Search for
- Structures: Swiss-model
- Domains: InterPro

Amphinase is a ribonuclease enzyme found in the oocytes of the Northern leopard frog (Rana pipiens). Amphinase is a member of the pancreatic ribonuclease protein superfamily and degrades long RNA substrates. Along with ranpirnase, another leopard frog ribonuclease, amphinase has been studied as a potential cancer therapy due to its unusual mechanism of cytotoxicity tested against tumor cells.
