= RNASE6 =

Protein-coding gene in the species Homo sapiens

Identifiers
- Aliases: RNASE6, RAD1, RNS6, RNasek6, ribonuclease A family member k6
- External IDs: OMIM: 601981; MGI: 1925666; GeneCards: RNASE6
Available structures
PDB	Ortholog search: PDBe RCSB
PDB	List of PDB id codes 4X09

Gene location (Human)
Chr.	Chromosome 14 (human)
Band	14q11.2	Start	20,781,268 bp
Band	14q11.2	End	20,782,467 bp

Gene location (Mouse)
Chr.	Chromosome 14 (mouse)
Band	14|14 C1	Start	51,361,365 bp
Band	14|14 C1	End	51,369,644 bp
RNA expression pattern
Bgee	Human / Mouse (ortholog); Top expressed in: monocyte; granulocyte; spleen; blood; gallbladder; lymph node; testicle; appendix; right coronary artery; rectum / Top expressed in: mesenteric lymph nodes; spleen; zygote; primary oocyte; granulocyte; embryo; secondary oocyte; blood; embryo; bone marrow; More reference expression data
BioGPS	n/a
Gene ontology
Molecular function	nuclease activity; endonuclease activity; hydrolase activity; nucleic acid binding; ribonuclease activity
Cellular component	extracellular region; extracellular space; intracellular anatomical structure; cytoplasmic vesicle; lysosome
Biological process	defense response; RNA catabolic process; antimicrobial humoral response; antibacterial humoral response; innate immune response; defense response to virus; antimicrobial humoral immune response mediated by antimicrobial peptide; RNA phosphodiester bond hydrolysis; defense response to bacterium; nucleic acid phosphodiester bond hydrolysis
Sources:Amigo / QuickGO
Orthologs
Databases	NCBI: entry; OMA: entry
Species	Human	Mouse
Entrez	6039	78416
Ensembl	ENSG00000169413	ENSMUSG00000021880
UniProt	Q93091; Q6IB39	Q9D244
RefSeq (mRNA)	NM_005615	NM_030098; NM_001360117
RefSeq (protein)	NP_005606; NP_005606.1	NP_084374; NP_001347046
Location (UCSC)	Chr 14: 20.78 – 20.78 Mb	Chr 14: 51.36 – 51.37 Mb
PubMed search
- Wikidata
View/Edit Human	View/Edit Mouse

Ribonuclease A family member k6 is a protein that in humans is encoded by the RNASE6 gene.

== Function ==
The protein encoded by this gene is a member of the ribonuclease A superfamily and functions in the urinary tract. The protein has broad-spectrum antimicrobial activity against pathogenic bacteria. [provided by RefSeq, Nov 2014].
