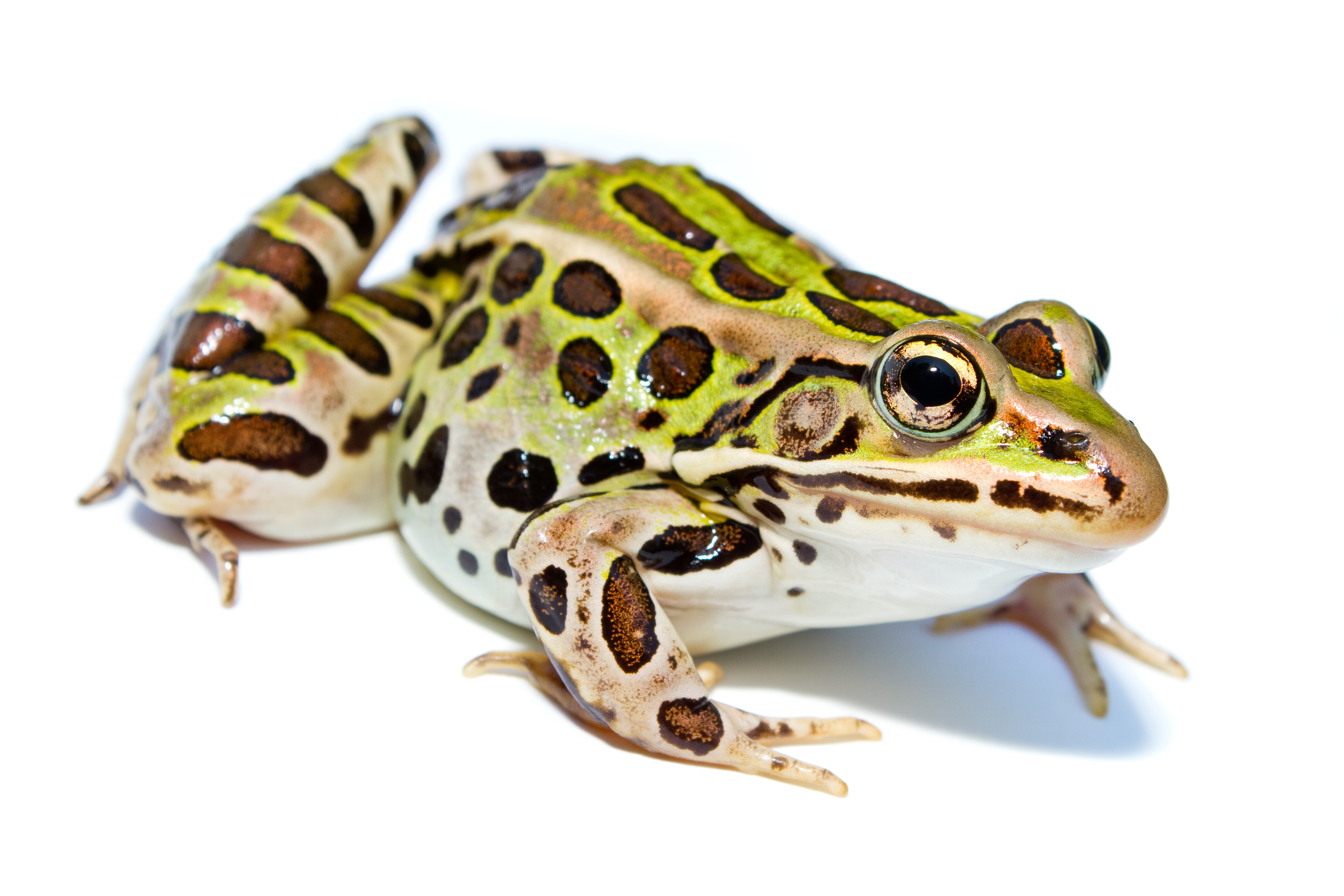

Conservation status
- Least Concern (IUCN 3.1)

- Secure (NatureServe)

Scientific classification
- Kingdom: Animalia
- Phylum: Chordata
- Class: Amphibia
- Order: Anura
- Family: Ranidae
- Genus: Lithobates
- Species: L. pipiens

Binomial name
- Lithobates pipiens (Schreber, 1782)
- Range of L. pipiens

= Northern leopard frog =

Species of amphibian

Lithobates pipiens formerly Rana pipiens, commonly known as the northern leopard frog, is a species of leopard frog from the true frog family, native to parts of Canada and the United States. It is the state amphibian of Minnesota and Vermont.

== Description ==
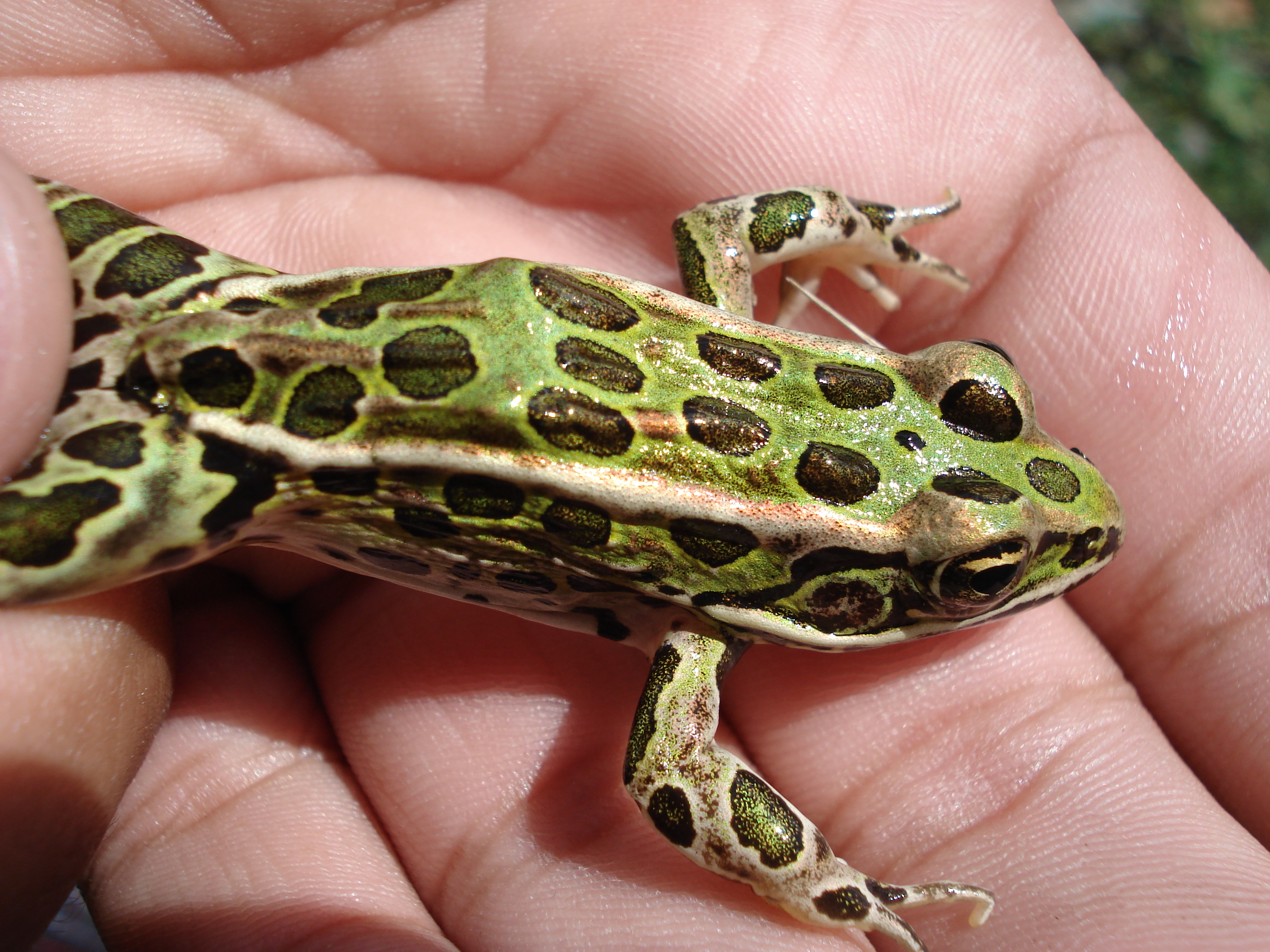
Young northern leopard frog

The northern leopard frog is a fairly large species of frog, reaching about 11 cm (4.3 in) in snout-to-vent length. It varies from green to brown in dorsal color, with large, dark, circular spots on its back, sides, and legs. Each spot is normally bordered by a lighter ring. A pair of dorsolateral folds starting from the back of the eye runs parallel to each other down the back. These dorsolateral folds are often lighter or occasionally pinkish in colour. Also, a pale stripe runs from the nostril, under the eye and tympanum, terminating at the shoulder. The ventral surface is white or pale green. The iris is golden and toes are webbed.

Tadpoles are dark brown or grey, with light blotches on the underside. The tail is pale tan.

== Color variations ==
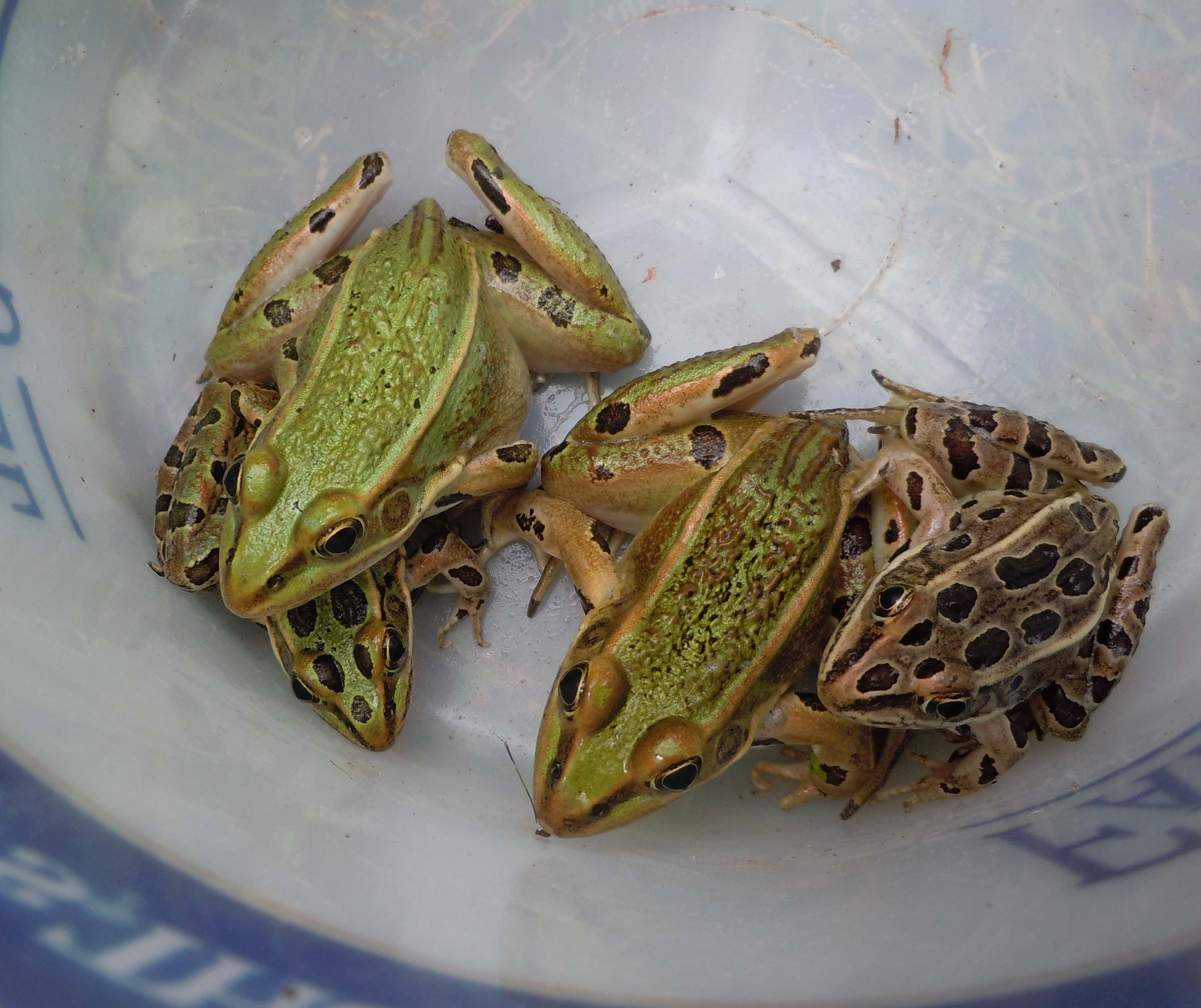
Two burnsi morphs, a green morph, and a brown morph of the northern leopard frog

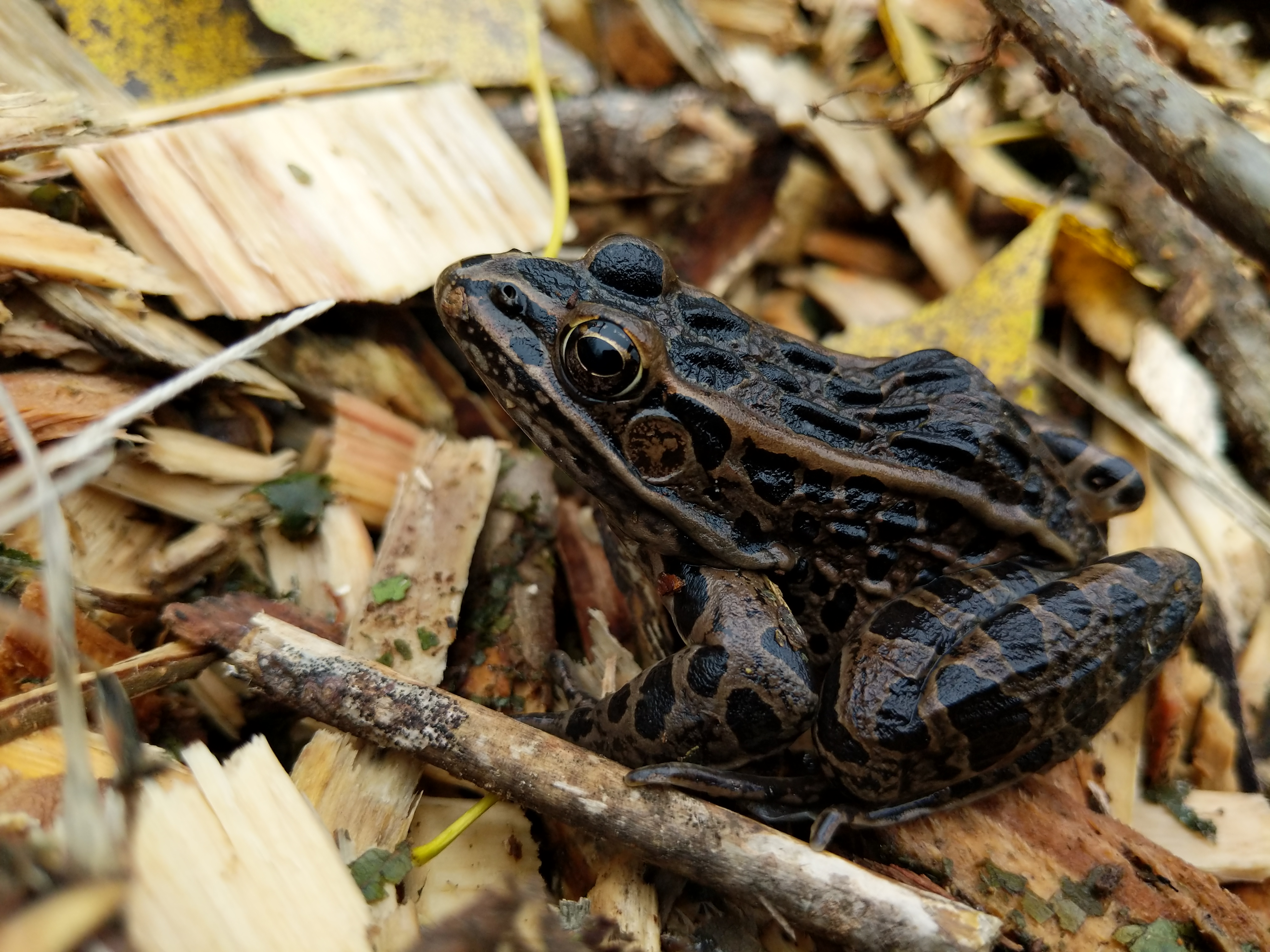
Brown morph northern leopard frog in a wood chip pile in Iowa

The northern leopard frog has several different color variations, with the most common two being the green and the brown morphs, with another morph known as the burnsi morph. Individuals with the burnsi morph coloration lack spots on their backs, but may or may not retain them on their legs. They can be bright green or brown and have yellow dorsal folds. Albinism also appears in this species, but is very rare. They can also be blue, and this is quite rare also.

== Ecology and behavior ==
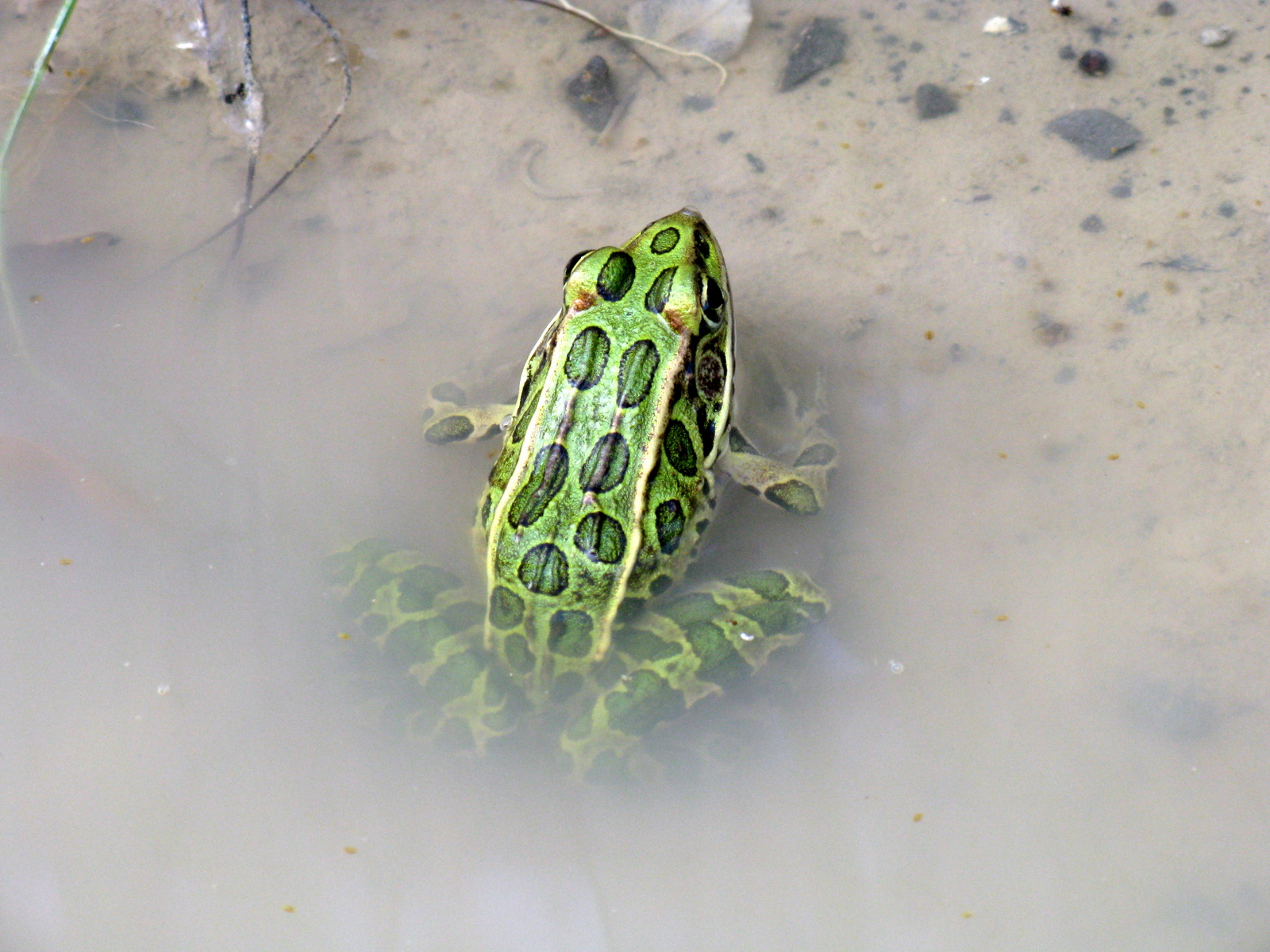
Near Welland Canal, Ontario

Northern leopard frogs have a wide range of habitats. They are found in permanent ponds, swamps, marshes, and slow-moving streams throughout forest, open, and urban areas. They normally inhabit water bodies with abundant aquatic vegetation. In the summer, they often abandon ponds and move to grassy areas and lawns. They are well adapted to cold and can be found above 3,000 m (9,840 ft) above mean sea level. Males make a short, snore-like call from water during spring and summer. The northern leopard frog breeds in the spring (March–June). Up to 6500 eggs are laid in water, and tadpoles complete development within the breeding pond. Tadpoles are light brown with black spots, and development takes 70–110 days, depending on conditions. Metamorph frogs are 2–3 cm (0.79–1.18 in) long and resemble the adult.

This species was once quite common through parts of western Canada and the United States until declines started occurring during the 1970s. Although the definitive cause of this decline is unknown, habitat loss and fragmentation, environmental contaminants, introduced fish, drought, and disease have been proposed as mechanisms of decline and are likely preventing species' recovery in many areas. Many populations of northern leopard frogs have not yet recovered from these declines.

Northern leopard frogs are preyed upon by many different animals, such as bass, pike, herons, garter snakes, water snakes, raccoons, green frogs, American bullfrogs, hawks, gulls, red foxes, American mink, North American river otters, leeches, newts, turtles, diving beetles, giant water bugs, and dragonfly larvae. They do not produce distasteful skin secretions and rely on speed to evade predation.

They eat a wide variety of animals, including crickets, flies, worms, and smaller frogs. Using their large mouths, they can even swallow birds and garter snakes. In one case, a mouse-eared bat was recorded as prey of this frog. This species is similar to the pickerel frog (Lithobates palustris) and the southern leopard frog (Lithobates sphenocephalus).

== Research ==
=== Medical ===
The northern leopard frog produces specific ribonucleases to its oocytes. Those enzymes are potential drugs for cancer. One such molecule, called ranpirnase (onconase), is in clinical trials as a treatment for pleural mesothelioma and lung tumors. Another, amphinase, has been described as a potential treatment for brain tumors.

=== Neuroscience ===
The northern leopard frog has been a preferred species for making discoveries about basic properties of neurons since the 1950s. The neuromuscular junction of the sciatic nerve fibers of the sartorius muscle of this frog has been the source of initial data about the nervous system.

=== Muscle physiology and biomechanics ===
The northern leopard frog is a popular species for in vitro experiments in muscle physiology and biomechanics due to the ease of accessibility for investigators in its native range and the ability of the sartorius muscle to stay alive in vitro for several hours. Furthermore, the reliance of the frog on two major modes of locomotion (jumping and swimming) allows for understanding how muscle properties contribute to organismal performance in each of these modes.

== Range ==
Northern leopard frogs occur from Great Slave Lake and Hudson Bay, Canada, south to the U.S. states of Kentucky and New Mexico. It is also found in Panama, where it is endemic to the central cordillera and western Pacific lowlands, although this is most likely an undescribed species. They occupy grasslands, lakeshores, and marshes.

== See also ==
- Southern leopard frog
- Plains leopard frog
- Rio Grande leopard frog
- Lowland leopard frog
- Relict leopard frog
- American bullfrog
- Pickerel frog
