= Unibrow =

Presence of abundant hair between the eyebrows

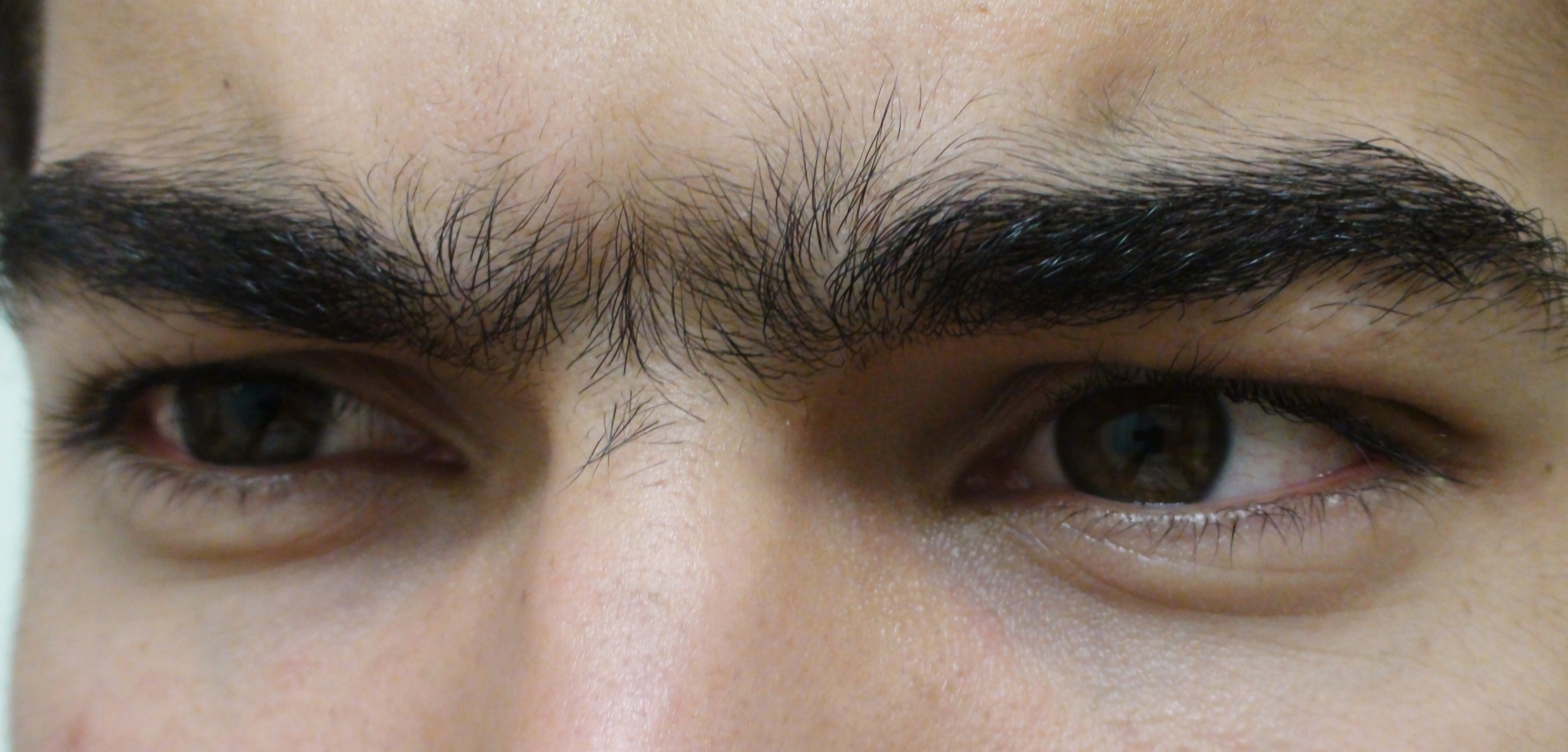
Close up of a unibrow

A unibrow (or monobrow; called synophrys in medicine) is a single eyebrow created when the two eyebrows meet in the middle above the bridge of the nose. The hair above the bridge of the nose is of the same color and thickness as the eyebrows, such that they converge to form one uninterrupted line of hair.

== History ==
The word monobrow first appeared in print in 1968, and the adjectival form monobrowed followed in 1973, in Martin Amis' novel The Rachel Papers. The first known use of the word unibrow was in 1981.

== Culture and beauty ==
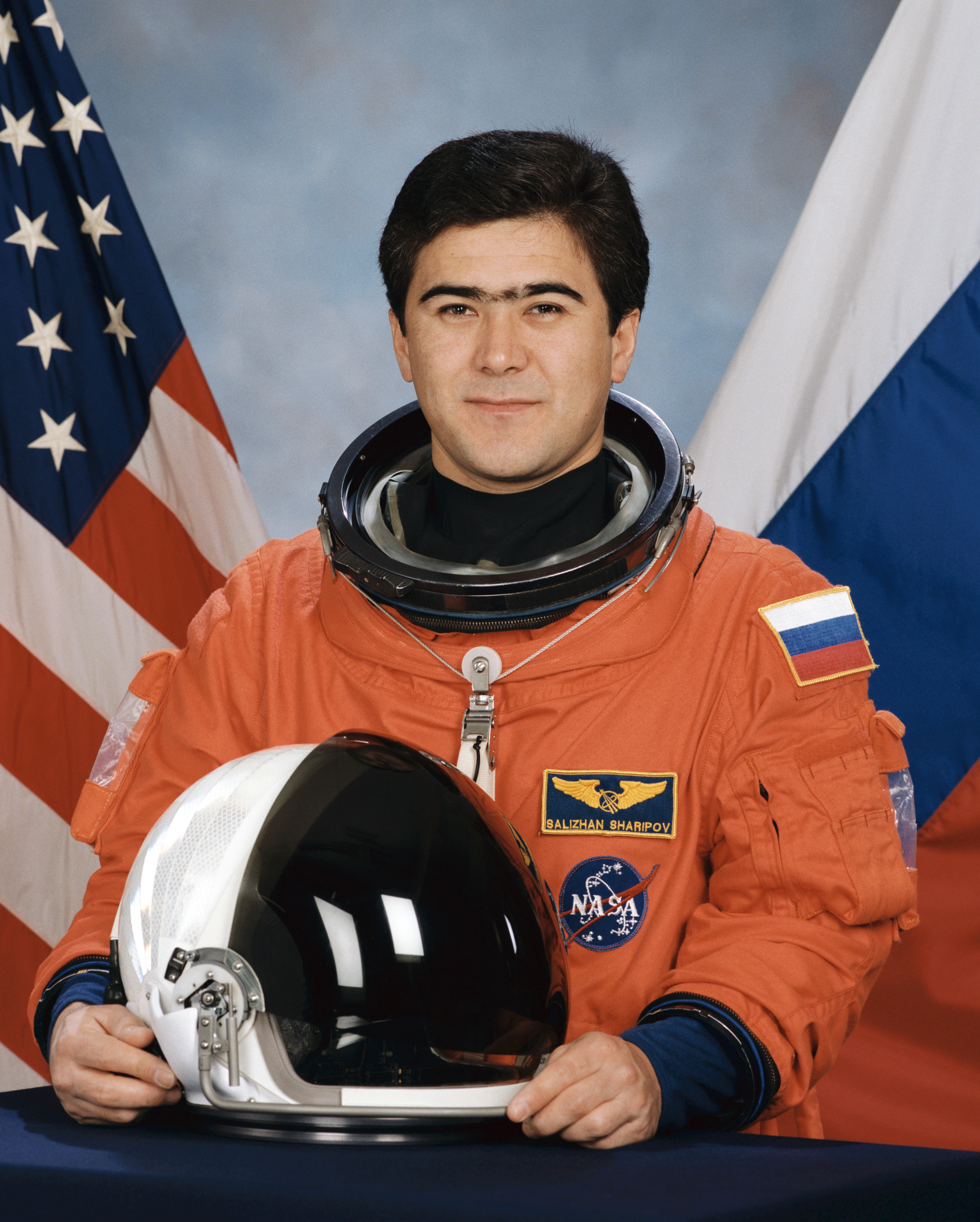
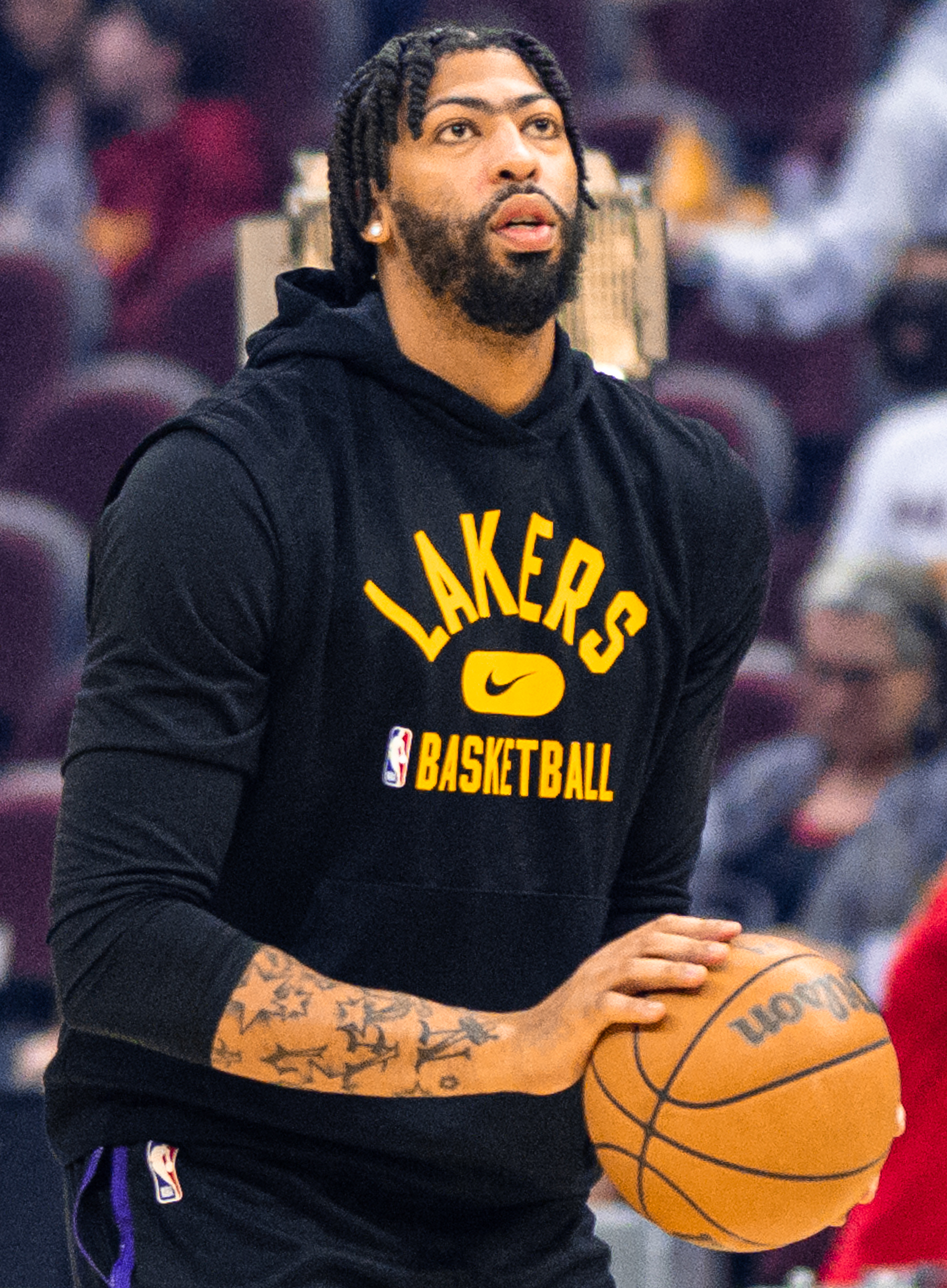
Kyrgyz Cosmonaut Salizhan Sharipov (left), NBA All-Star player, Anthony Davis (right)

Some nations prize the unibrow. It is a sign of beauty among Baluchi Omanis, whose women sometimes draw a black line joining the brows as a part of their routine makeup to fake a unibrow. A study found the prevalence of synophrys to be at 11.87% in the Omani population. In Tajikistan, where the unibrow is similarly viewed as attractive, some women dry and extract a herb known locally as usma and daub it onto their brows to mimic one. Urban women may do the same with a kohl liner or a kajal pen.

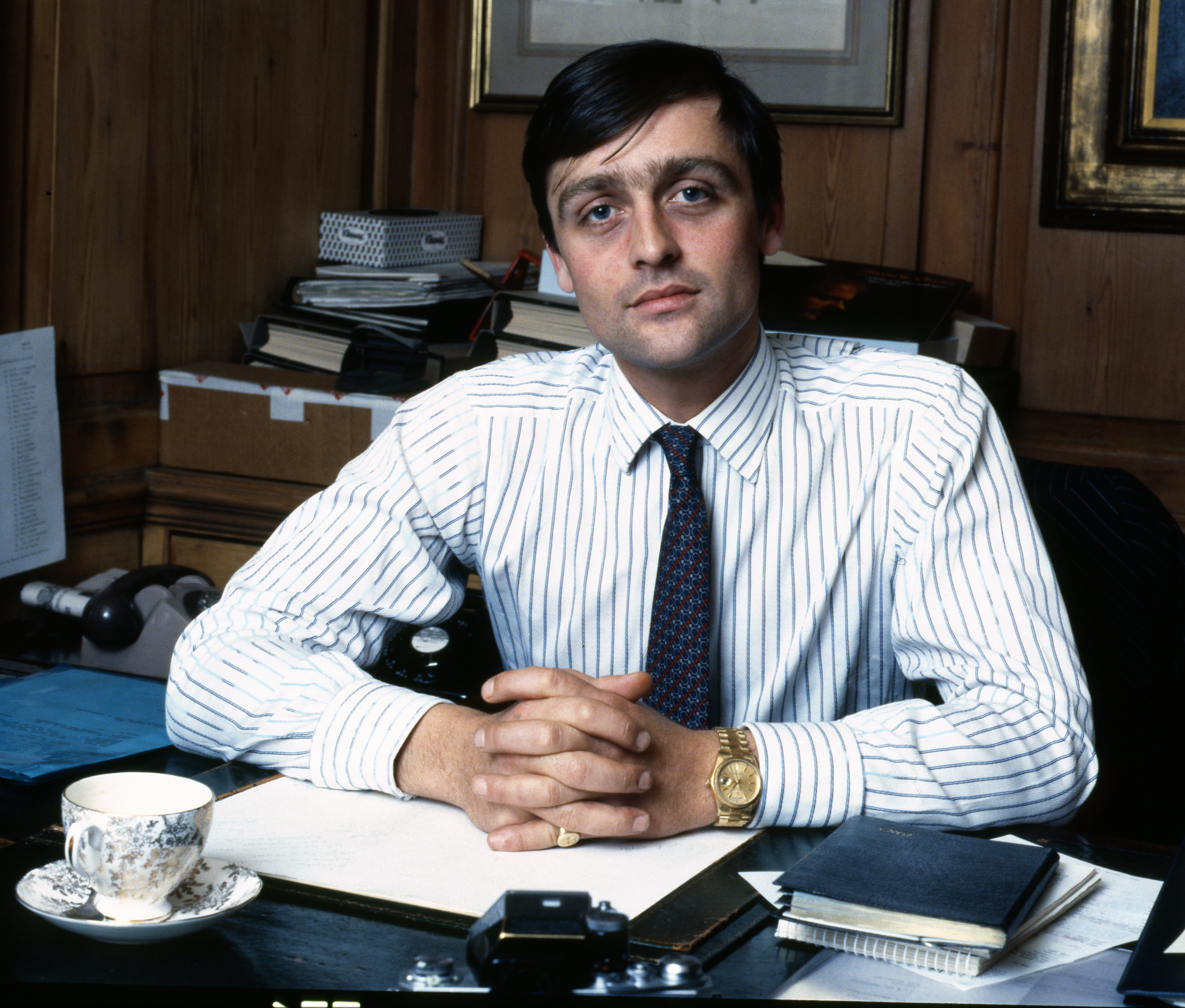
Gerald Grosvenor, 6th Duke of Westminster

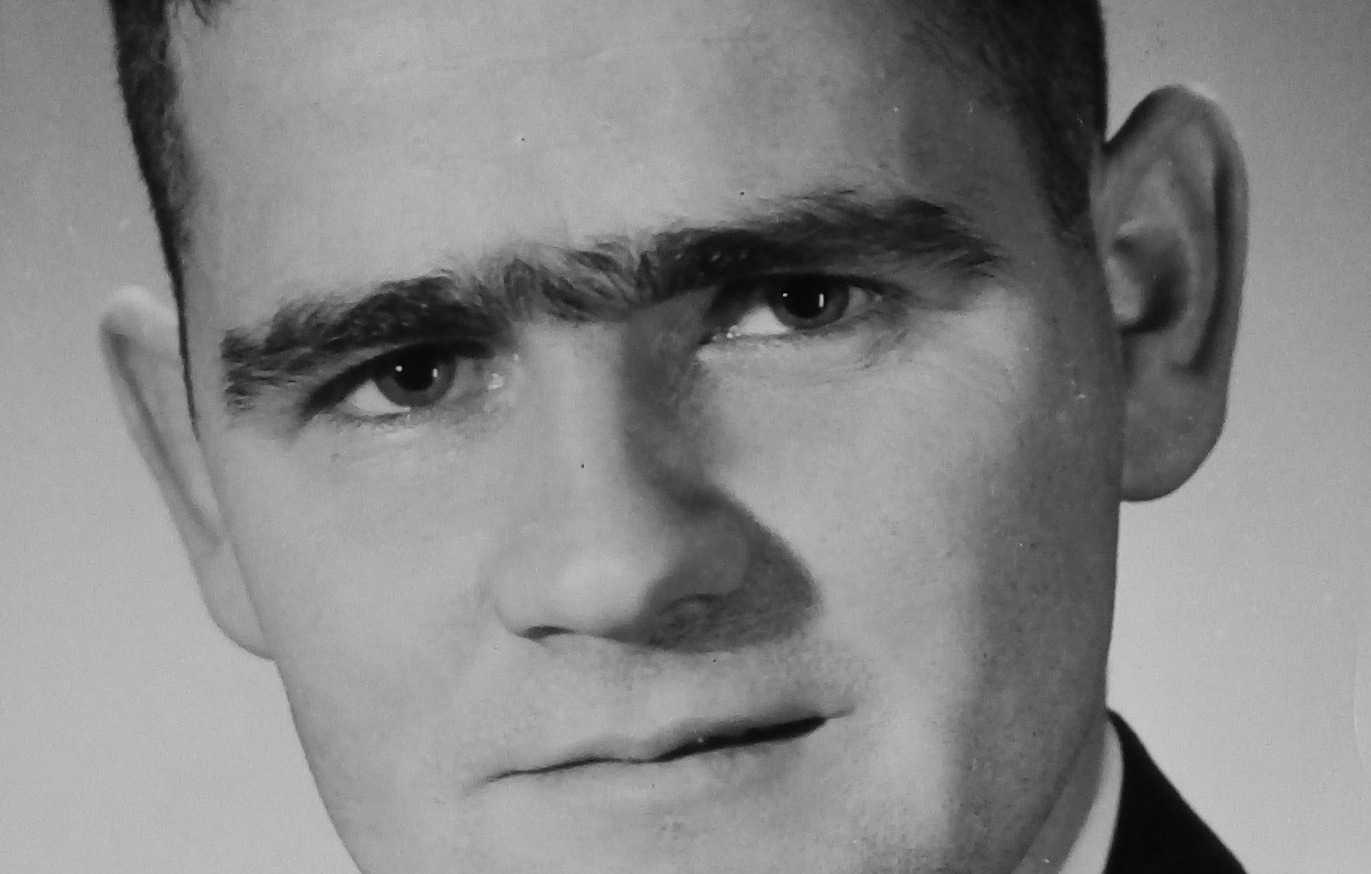
New Zealand politician Brian MacDonell

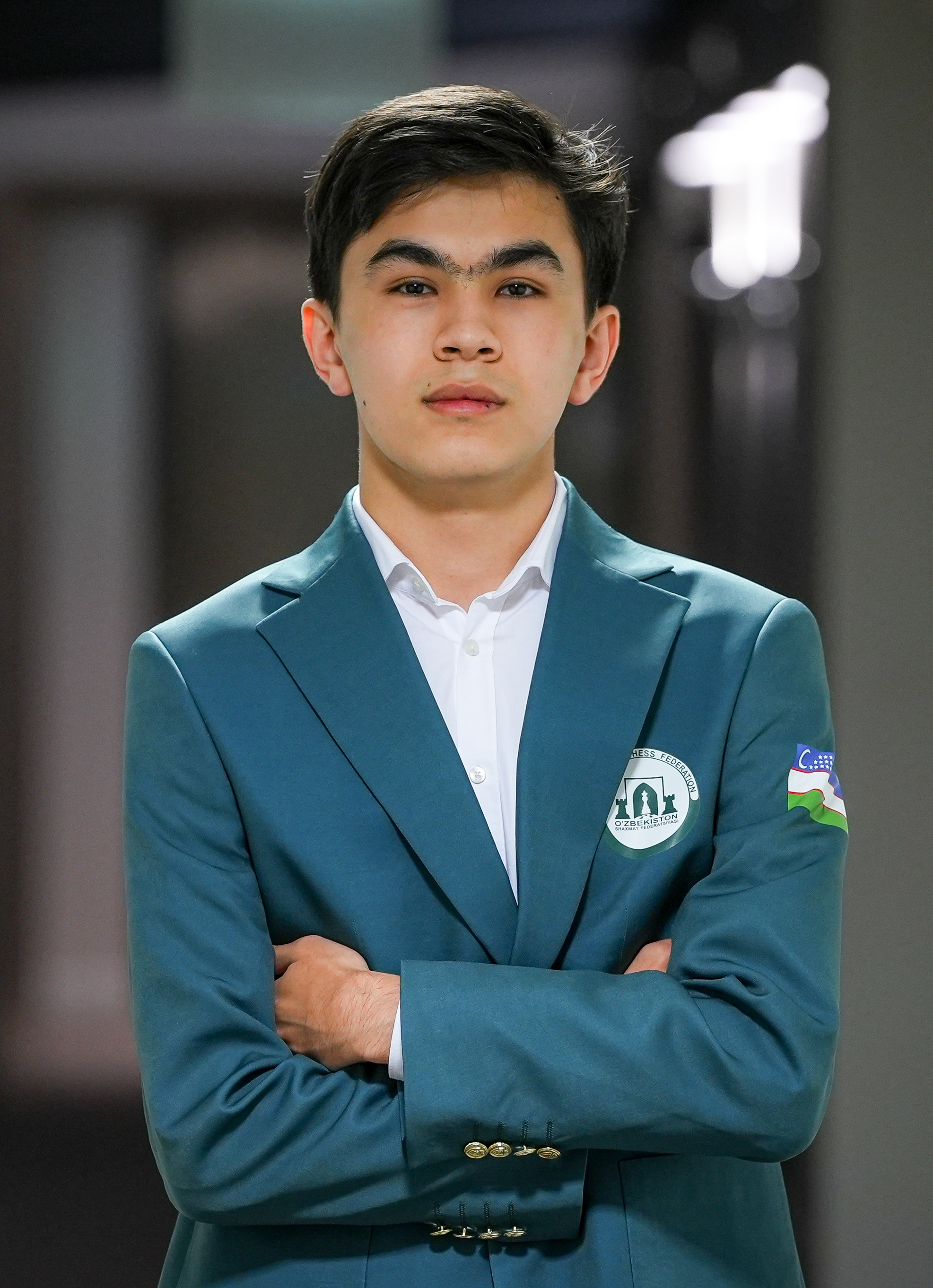
Chess Grandmaster Javokhir Sindarov

The unibrow has largely been seen as undesirable in the Americas and Europe, with the hairs often plucked, shaved, or waxed away. Exceptions include the artist Frida Kahlo, famous for her unibrow, which she often depicted in self-portraits, the Greek-Cypriot model Sophia Hadjipanteli, and the Spanish actor Omar Ayuso.

The unibrow is also the trademark of the NBA player Anthony Davis, the football player Marouane Fellaini, and the YouTuber ElectroBOOM. The boxer Roberto Elizondo famously sported a unibrow during his professional career.

== Medicine ==
=== Genetics ===
The unibrow is a genetic trait associated with the PAX3 gene; rare mutations of PAX3 have been shown to cause Waardenburg syndrome type 1 (85% of patients with this condition have a unibrow).

=== Medical conditions ===
A unibrow is part of normal human variation, but can also stem from developmental disorders. A unibrow is a recognized feature of Cornelia De Lange syndrome, a genetic disorder whose main features include moderate to severe learning difficulties, limb abnormalities such as oligodactyly (fewer than normal fingers or toes), and phocomelia (malformed limbs), and facial abnormalities including a long philtrum (the slight depression/line between the nose and mouth).

Other medical conditions associated with a unibrow include:

- 3MC syndrome 1
- Acromegaloid facial appearance syndrome
- Acromesomelic dysplasia 4
- Amaurosis-hypertrichosis syndrome
- Arrhinia with choanal atresia and microphthalmia syndrome
- Autosomal recessive spinocerebellar ataxia 17
- Blepharophimosis-impaired intellectual development syndrome
- Blepharophimosis-ptosis-esotropia-syndactyly-short stature syndrome
- Brachycephaly, trichomegaly, and developmental delay
- Chromosome 1p36 deletion syndrome
- Coffin-Siris syndrome 12
- Cognitive impairment – coarse facies – heart defects – obesity – pulmonary involvement – short stature – skeletal dysplasia syndrome
- Congenital muscular hypertrophy-cerebral syndrome

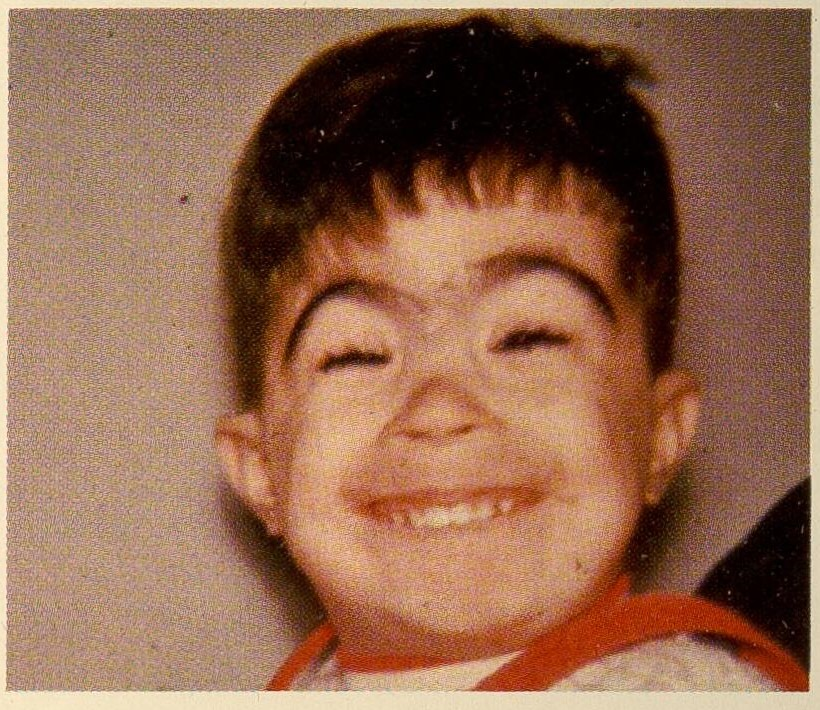
Unibrow in Cornelia de Lange syndrome

- Cornelia de Lange syndrome 1–5
- Corpus callosum agenesis-abnormal genitalia syndrome
- Cortical dysplasia, complex, with other brain malformations 11
- Deafness, cataract, impaired intellectual development, and polyneuropathy
- Deficiency of transaldolase
- DeSanto-Shinawi syndrome due to WAC point mutation
- Developmental and epileptic encephalopathy 23, 66, 83, 84, 85 (with or without midline brain defects), 100, and 105 (with hypopituitarism)
- Developmental delay with variable intellectual disability and dysmorphic facies
- Developmental delay, impaired speech, and behavioral abnormalities
- Diamond-Blackfan anemia 21
- Early-onset progressive diffuse brain atrophy-microcephaly-muscle weakness-optic atrophy syndrome
- Epilepsy, X-linked 2, with or without impaired intellectual development and dysmorphic features
- Epilepsy-telangiectasia syndrome
- Focal segmental glomerulosclerosis and neurodevelopmental syndrome
- Fontaine progeroid syndrome
- Goldberg-Shprintzen megacolon syndrome
- Growth delay due to insulin-like growth factor I resistance
- Hajdu-Cheney syndrome
- Hennekam lymphangiectasia-lymphedema syndrome 3
- Holoprosencephaly 5, 7, and 11

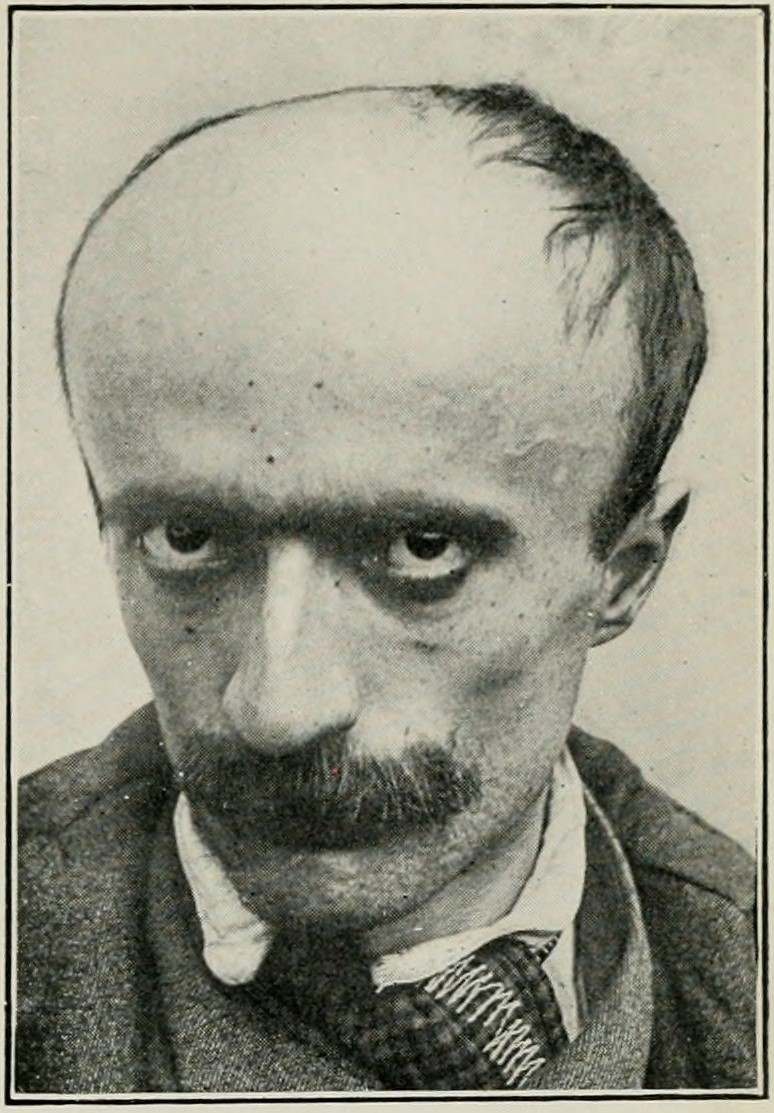
Hydrocephalic man with a unibrow

- Hypotonia, ataxia, and delayed development syndrome
- Intellectual developmental disorder 61
- Intellectual developmental disorder with or without peripheral neuropathy
- Intellectual developmental disorder, autosomal dominant 64 and 65
- Intellectual developmental disorder, autosomal recessive 68
- Intellectual developmental disorder, X-linked, syndromic, with pigmentary mosaicism and coarse facies
- Intellectual disability, autosomal dominant 29, 30, 34, 43, 48, and 52
- Intellectual disability, autosomal recessive 5, 13, 16, 45, 46, and 61
- Intellectual disability, X-linked 21, 73, 97, and 106
- Intellectual disability, X-linked, syndromic 33
- Intellectual disability-brachydactyly-Pierre Robin syndrome
- Intellectual disability-facial dysmorphism syndrome due to SETD5 haploinsufficiency
- Joubert syndrome 35
- KBG syndrome
- Kleefstra syndrome 1
- Lissencephaly 6 with microcephaly
- Macrothrombocytopenia-lymphedema-developmental delay-facial dysmorphism-camptodactyly syndrome
- Mandibulofacial dysostosis-macroblepharon-macrostomia syndrome
- Marshall-Smith syndrome
- Microcephaly 4, primary, autosomal recessive
- Midface hypoplasia, hearing impairment, elliptocytosis, and nephrocalcinosis
- Mitochondrial complex 4 deficiency, nuclear type 20
- Mitochondrial complex III deficiency nuclear type 7

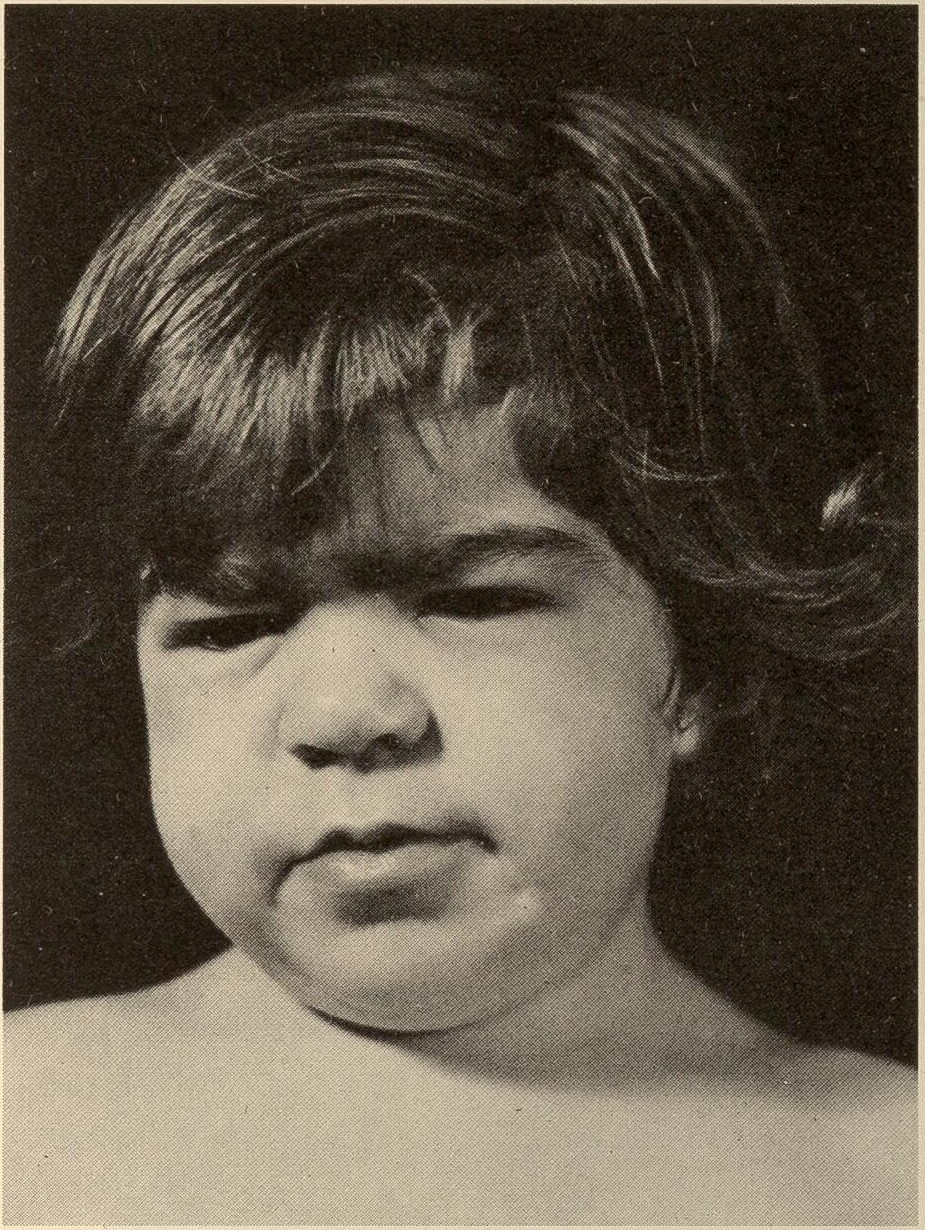
Unibrow in MPS-III

- Mucopolysaccharidosis, MPS-III-A to -D
- Neurodevelopmental disorder with dysmorphic facies and variable seizures
- Neurodevelopmental disorder with facial dysmorphism, absent language, and pseudo-pelger-huet anomaly
- Neurodevelopmental disorder with growth retardation, dysmorphic facies, and corpus callosum abnormalities
- Neurodevelopmental disorder with microcephaly, short stature, and speech delay
- Neurodevelopmental disorder with severe motor impairment and absent language
- Neurodevelopmental disorder with spasticity and poor growth
- Neurodevelopmental disorder with spasticity, cataracts, and cerebellar hypoplasia
- Periventricular nodular heterotopia 9
- Pontocerebellar hypoplasia type 7, 8, and 10
- Primrose syndrome
- Severe feeding difficulties-failure to thrive-microcephaly due to ASXL3 deficiency syndrome
- Sialuria
- Skin creases, congenital symmetric circumferential, 2
- Smith-Magenis syndrome
- Spondyloepimetaphyseal dysplasia, Genevieve type
- Spondyloepiphyseal dysplasia, sensorineural hearing loss, impaired intellectual development, and leber congenital amaurosis
- Syndromic X-linked intellectual disability Chudley-Schwartz type
- Syndromic X-linked intellectual disability Nascimento type
- Syndromic X-linked intellectual disability Siderius type
- Syndromic X-linked intellectual disability Snyder type
- Trigonocephaly 1
- Uruguay Faciocardiomusculoskeletal syndrome
- Waardenburg syndrome types 1, 2A, and 3
- Wiedemann-Steiner syndrome
- Zimmermann-Laband syndrome 1, 2, and 3

== See also ==
- Glabella
