= SETD5 =

Protein-coding gene in the species Homo sapiens

Identifiers
- Aliases: SETD5, SET domain containing 5, MRD23, SETD5A
- External IDs: OMIM: 615743; MGI: 1920145; GeneCards: SETD5
Enzyme activity
EC #	BRENDA	ExPASy	KEGG	MetaCyc
2.1.1.359	↗	↗	↗	↗
2.1.1.367	↗	↗	↗	↗

Gene location (Human)
Chr.	Chromosome 3 (human)
Band	3p25.3	Start	9,397,615 bp
Band	3p25.3	End	9,479,240 bp

Gene location (Mouse)
Chr.	Chromosome 6 (mouse)
Band	6|6 E3	Start	113,077,365 bp
Band	6|6 E3	End	113,153,435 bp
RNA expression pattern
Bgee	Human / Mouse (ortholog); Top expressed in: epithelium of colon; sural nerve; right hemisphere of cerebellum; right uterine tube; right lobe of thyroid gland; ventricular zone; body of uterus; left lobe of thyroid gland; gastric mucosa; left ovary / Top expressed in: genital tubercle; tail of embryo; hand; ascending aorta; aortic valve; vas deferens; ventricular zone; Rostral migratory stream; human fetus; pineal gland; More reference expression data
BioGPS	n/a
Gene ontology
Molecular function	protein binding; histone methyltransferase activity (H3-K9 specific); methyltransferase activity; transferase activity; histone-lysine N-methyltransferase activity
Cellular component	nucleus; Cdc73/Paf1 complex; nucleoplasm
Biological process	regulation of histone acetylation; regulation of chromatin organization; transcription, DNA-templated; regulation of transcription, DNA-templated; chromatin organization; histone H3-K9 methylation; methylation; histone lysine methylation
Sources:Amigo / QuickGO
Orthologs
Databases	NCBI: entry; OMA: entry
Species	Human	Mouse
Entrez	55209	72895
Ensembl	ENSG00000168137	ENSMUSG00000034269
UniProt	Q9C0A6	Q5XJV7
RefSeq (mRNA)	NM_001080517; NM_001292043; NM_018187; NM_001349451	NM_028385; NM_173005
RefSeq (protein)	NP_001073986; NP_001278972; NP_001336380	NP_082661; NP_766593
Location (UCSC)	Chr 3: 9.4 – 9.48 Mb	Chr 6: 113.08 – 113.15 Mb
PubMed search
- Wikidata
View/Edit Human	View/Edit Mouse

SET domain containing 5 is an enzyme that in humans is encoded by the SETD5 gene. It is a member of the histone lysine methyltransferase family. Overexpression of SETD5 is associated positively with progression of breast cancer. Mutations in SETD5 are associated with a rare developmental disorder termed autosomal dominant mental retardation-23 (MRD23, MIM#615761). MRD23 is mainly characterized by variable congenital defects and dysmorphic facies. Clinical features include developmental delay, intellectual disability, chewing abnormalities, hypospadias, and cryptorchidism in males in association with craniofacial dysmorphisms.

== Interactions ==
Based on research in mice, this enzyme interacts with a number of components of the PAF1 complex, including LEO1, CTR9, CDC73. This complex is involved in regulating DNA to RNA transcription by RNA polymerase II. It also interacts with other transcription regulators like NCOR1 and HDAC3.
