= Bubble hair deformity =

Medical condition

- Specialty: Dermatology
- Symptoms: Short weak brittle hair, that feels rough
- Complications: Hair breaks easily
- Causes: Excess heat on wet hair, chemicals
- Risk factors: Hair dryers, hair straighteners, curling tongs
- Diagnostic method: Appearance, microscopy
- Prevention: Avoiding excessive heat and chemicals
- Frequency: Females>males

Bubble hair deformity is damage of the hair shaft, resulting in patches of short weak brittle hair, that feels rough.

It is typically caused by chemicals and heat; temperatures greater than 125 °C on wet hair, such as with the use of hair dryers, hair straighteners and curling tongs.

== Definition ==
Bubble hair deformity is damage of the hair shaft, resulting in patches of short weak brittle hair, that feels rough.

== Cause ==
It is typically caused by chemicals and heat; temperatures greater than 125 °C on wet hair, such as with the use of hair dryers, hair straighteners and curling tongs.

== Mechanism ==
Bubble hair is characterized by rows of bubbles seen microscopically within localized areas of the brittle hair. These air-filled spaces occur in the cortex of the hair shaft that correspond to the breakdown of keratin and local air expansion triggered by hot water passing through the shaft. There may be an inherited predisposition. It can be associated with trichorrhexis nodosa and trichoptilosis.

== Diagnosis ==
Diagnosis can be confirmed by microscopy.

== Prevention ==
Avoiding excessive heat and chemicals can prevent the condition.

== Epidemiology ==
Bubble hair is more common in females.
