= Katerina Georgiadou =

Greek model

- Born: Katerina Georgiadou; 1982 (age 43–44); Thessaloniki, Greece
- Modeling information
- Height: 1.73 m (5 ft 8 in)
- Hair color: Blond
- Eye color: Blue

Katerina Georgiadou (Greek: Κατερίνα Γεωργιάδου) (born 1982 in Thessaloniki, Greece) is a Greek model and beauty pageant titleholder. She has appeared in fashion magazines and international events.

Beyond her modeling career, she featured in the 2015 film "Bourek," the 2019 short "Chick 'n' Fox," and the 2021 podcast series "Apo anatolika."

== Background ==
Georgiadou lives in Argyroupoli (Greek: Αργυρούπολη). She studied classical ballet and gymnastics for eight years at the University of Gymnastics in Athens. Upon her engagement to Stathis Tavlaridis in 2007, it was announced that she would give up modeling, and the couple married in 2009. They have a daughter named Anastasia. The couple divorced in 2014.

== Career ==
Georgiadou won the 2002 title of Miss Hellas (Greek: Miss Ελλάς) at the Miss Star Hellas pageant and went on to represent her country as Miss Greece in the Miss World pageant held in London. The pageant originally was going to be held in Abuja, Nigeria but was moved to London when violence broke out and more than 100 people died in riots provoked by the contest when existing religious tensions between Christians and Muslims erupted.

She was also a volunteer at the 2004 Summer Olympics.

== See also ==
- Sofia Harmanda
- Sophia Hadjipanteli
