= Superkiller complex protein 8 =

Protein found in humans

SKIC8

Identifiers
- Aliases: SKIC8, REC14, SKI8, WD repeat domain 61, WDR61, SKI8 subunit of superkiller complex
- External IDs: OMIM: 609540; MGI: 1917493; GeneCards: SKIC8
Available structures
PDB	Ortholog search: PDBe RCSB
PDB	List of PDB id codes 3OW8

Gene location (Human)
Chr.	Chromosome 15 (human)
Band	15q25.1	Start	78,277,835 bp
Band	15q25.1	End	78,299,703 bp

Gene location (Mouse)
Chr.	Chromosome 9 (mouse)
Band	9|9 A5.3	Start	54,622,019 bp
Band	9|9 A5.3	End	54,641,803 bp
RNA expression pattern
Bgee	Human / Mouse (ortholog); Top expressed in: tibia; corpus epididymis; pituitary gland; right uterine tube; anterior pituitary; kidney tubule; parotid gland; gingival epithelium; parietal pleura; palpebral conjunctiva / Top expressed in: Paneth cell; medullary collecting duct; urothelium; condyle; ureter; transitional epithelium of urinary bladder; fossa; primitive streak; hair follicle; endothelial cell of lymphatic vessel; More reference expression data
BioGPS	n/a
Gene ontology
Molecular function	protein binding
Cellular component	Cdc73/Paf1 complex; Ski complex; nucleus; cytoplasm; nucleoplasm; cytosol
Biological process	histone H3-K4 trimethylation; positive regulation of histone H3-K4 methylation; regulation of transcription, DNA-templated; negative regulation of myeloid cell differentiation; Wnt signaling pathway; positive regulation of histone H3-K79 methylation; transcription, DNA-templated; positive regulation of transcription elongation from RNA polymerase II promoter; positive regulation of transcription by RNA polymerase II; transcription by RNA polymerase II; transcription elongation from RNA polymerase II promoter; protein ubiquitination; exonucleolytic catabolism of deadenylated mRNA
Sources:Amigo / QuickGO
Orthologs
Databases	NCBI: entry; OMA: entry
Species	Human	Mouse
Entrez	80349	66317
Ensembl	ENSG00000140395	ENSMUSG00000061559
UniProt	Q9GZS3	Q9ERF3
RefSeq (mRNA)	NM_001303247; NM_001303248; NM_025234	NM_001025375; NM_001025376; NM_023191
RefSeq (protein)	NP_001290176; NP_001290177; NP_079510	NP_001020546; NP_001020547; NP_075680
Location (UCSC)	Chr 15: 78.28 – 78.3 Mb	Chr 9: 54.62 – 54.64 Mb
PubMed search
- Wikidata
View/Edit Human	View/Edit Mouse

Superkiller complex protein 8 (or Ski8) is a protein that in humans is encoded by the SKIC8 gene (previously WDR61). As its name suggests, this protein is part of the superkiller complex, which is involved in extracting mRNA from ribosomes and sending it to the exosome complex to be broken down. Unlike the other Ski complex members, Ski2 and Ski3, in humans (but not yeast) Ski8 is also part of a second RNA-associated protein complex: the PAF1 complex, which is involved in regulating DNA to RNA transcription by RNA polymerase II.
