= Superkiller complex protein 2 =

Enzyme found in humans

SKIC2

Identifiers
- Aliases: SKIC2, 170A, DDX13, HLP, SKI2, SKI2W, SKIV2, THES2, SKIV2L1, Ski2 like RNA helicase, SKIV2L, SKI2 subunit of superkiller complex
- External IDs: OMIM: 600478; MGI: 1099835; GeneCards: SKIC2
Enzyme activity
| EC # | BRENDA | ExPASy | KEGG | MetaCyc |
|---|---|---|---|---|
| 3.6.4.13 | ↗ | ↗ | ↗ | ↗ |

Gene location (Human)
| Chr. | Chromosome 6 (human) |
| Band | 6p21.33 | Start | 31,959,117 bp |
| Band | 6p21.33 | End | 31,969,751 bp |

Gene location (Mouse)
| Chr. | Chromosome 17 (mouse) |
| Band | 17|17 B1 | Start | 35,058,204 bp |
| Band | 17|17 B1 | End | 35,069,186 bp |
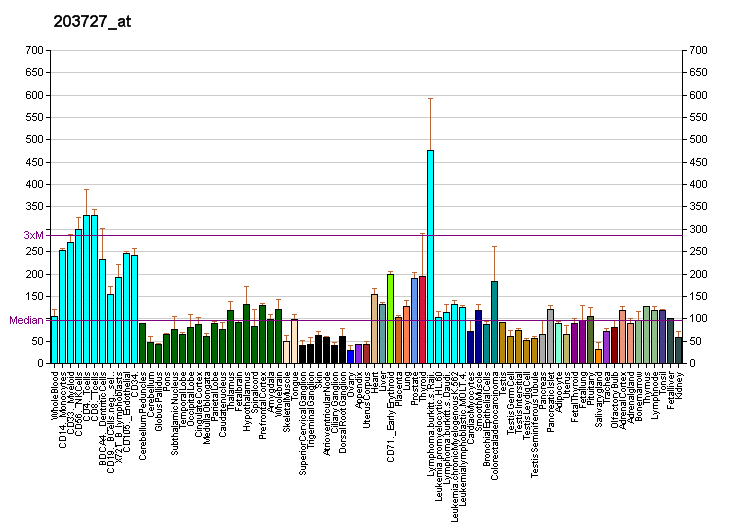
RNA expression pattern
| Bgee | Human / Mouse (ortholog); Top expressed in: right lobe of liver; pituitary gland; anterior pituitary; granulocyte; spleen; right adrenal gland; right adrenal cortex; mucosa of transverse colon; right lobe of thyroid gland; fundus / Top expressed in: spermatocyte; granulocyte; Ileal epithelium; spermatid; dentate gyrus of hippocampal formation granule cell; lip; superior frontal gyrus; right kidney; ventricular zone; genital tubercle; More reference expression data |
| BioGPS | More reference expression data |
Gene ontology
| Molecular function | RNA helicase activity; nucleotide binding; hydrolase activity; ATP binding; helicase activity; RNA binding; nucleic acid binding |
| Cellular component | cytoplasm; Ski complex; nucleus; cytosol |
| Biological process | RNA catabolic process; exonucleolytic catabolism of deadenylated mRNA; nuclear-transcribed mRNA catabolic process, 3'-5' exonucleolytic nonsense-mediated decay |
Sources:Amigo / QuickGO
Orthologs
| Databases | NCBI: entry; OMA: entry |
| Species | Human | Mouse |
| Entrez | 6499 | 108077 |
| Ensembl | ENSG00000232616; ENSG00000204351; ENSG00000228896; ENSG00000206353; ENSG00000223493 ENSG00000225737 | ENSMUSG00000040356 |
| UniProt | Q15477 | n/a |
| RefSeq (mRNA) | NM_006929 | NM_021337; NM_178062 |
| RefSeq (protein) | NP_008860 | n/a |
| Location (UCSC) | Chr 6: 31.96 – 31.97 Mb | Chr 17: 35.06 – 35.07 Mb |
| PubMed search |
- Wikidata
| View/Edit Human | View/Edit Mouse |

Superkiller complex protein 2 (or Ski2) is an enzyme that in humans is encoded by the SKIC2 gene (previously SKIV2L). This enzyme functions as a helicase as part of the superkiller complex, and is found in both humans and yeast. It may be involved in antiviral activity by blocking translation of poly(A) deficient mRNAs. The SKIC2 gene is located in the class III region of the major histocompatibility complex.

DEAD box proteins, characterized by the conserved motif Asp-Glu-Ala-Asp (DEAD), are putative RNA helicases. They are implicated in a number of cellular processes involving alteration of RNA secondary structure such as translation initiation, nuclear and mitochondrial splicing, and ribosome and spliceosome assembly. Based on their distribution patterns, some members of this family are believed to be involved in embryogenesis, spermatogenesis, and cellular growth and division.

== Identification of gene ==
A novel human cDNA, homologous to the yeast gene SKI2, was identified in 1995. Researchers localised the corresponding gene to chromosome 6p.21.

The SKIV2L gene, also known as SKI2W or Ski2-like RNA Helicase, spans 11Kb and contains 28 exons. Located between RD and RP1 gene in MHC III on the short arm of chromosome 6, it has 16 transcripts on Ensembl, 3 of which are protein coding. One of these proteins, SKI2W, has 1246 amino acids and a helicase binding domain between amino acids 319-475, and is thought to be involved in exosome RNA mediated RNA decay.

The presence of the DEVH-box at position 423-426 within SKI2W infers that it is a member of the SF-II helicase family.

The human protein was named SKI2W because of its similarity to yeast protein Ski2, which has highly homologous (nearly identical) regions at the helicase domain and the C terminal.

SKIV2L transcripts are expressed in most, if not all, human tissue tested including spleen, thymus, small intestine, colon, heart, brain and liver.

Table 1. Table summarising properties of SKIV2L and encoded proteins.
| Species | Gene | Locus | CCDS code | UniProt | Exons | Amino acids |
|---|---|---|---|---|---|---|
| Human | SKIV2L | 6p21.33 | 4731.1 | Q15477 | 28 | 1246 |
| Mouse | Skiv2l | chr 17 | 28661.1 | n/a | 28 | 1244 |

== Function ==
The majority of the eukaryotic genome is transcribed into RNA molecules, which generates pools of RNA that require processing and surveillance in order to control abundant and damaged material. The RNA exosome multiprotein complex performs this function and is dependent on cofactors. The exosome was initially discovered in yeast but is also present in higher eukaryotes. It has activity in both the nucleus and cytoplasm for normal mRNA decay and for RNA surveillance and quality control through nonsense mediated; non-stop and no-go decay.

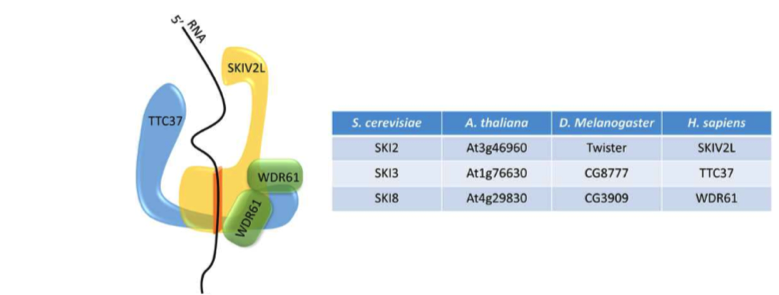
Figure 1. Model prediction of human SKI complex

SKI2W is part of the tetraprotein ski complex which is an obligatory cytoplasmic cofactor of the RNA exosome and consists of SKI2W, TTC37 and 2 subunits of WD40 (encoded by WDR61), as pictured in Figure 1. Much of the information on SKI2W function is from yeast studies, where the homologue for SKI2W is ski2. In yeast, ski2 forms a ski complex with ski3 and 2 subunits of ski8. The ski2 (the SKI2W homolog in yeast) contains DEVH-box proteins which suggests it is the only protein in the ski complex to have an enzymatic helicase function. The exact interactions are not well described, however DEVH-box helicases are shown to separate nucleic strands in an energy dependent manner. The yeast ski complex has been more extensively studied than the human homologue, and a crystal structure of the RNA exosome and its interactions has been created that supports a role in non-stop decay, to thereby protect the cell from aberrant proteins.

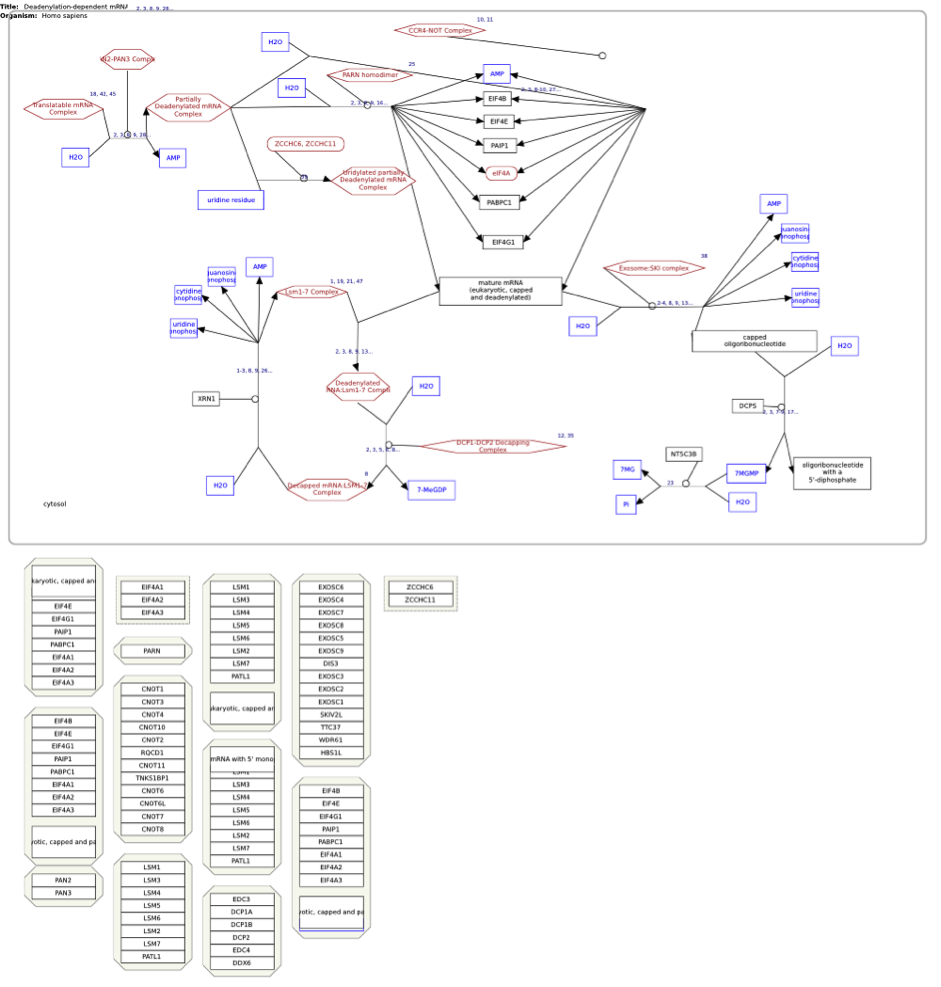
Figure 2. Deadenylation-dependent mRNA decay (Homo sapiens)

Ski2 protein in yeast is also thought to have a role in antiviral defence, probably via its role in RNA turnover or through control of RNA degradation.

SKIV2L has been shown to be a negative regulator of the Rig-I like receptors (RLRs) that detect RNA. The authors found that the cytosolic RNA exosome, defined by the SKIV2L RNA helicase, is important for limiting the activation of RLRs and the antiviral response. If the endogenous RNAs fail to be processed, the cell undergoes an unfolded protein response which triggers an antiviral interferon (IFN) response. Human cells with SKIV2L deficiency are shown to have a strong IFN signature suggestive of a chronic antiviral response. The authors suggest that patients could subsequently be more prone to autoimmune disorders, although this has not been shown as yet, possibly due to the high mortality of patients. However this finding does suggest a link between SKIV2L and immune response.

== Clinical significance ==
Pathogenic variants in SKIV2L has been linked to Tricho-hepato-enteric syndrome (THES), also known as syndromic diarrhoea (SD) or phenotypic diarrhoea (PD). First described by Stankler et al (1982) as Stankler syndrome, this condition was renamed THES in 1994. THES is rare, with an estimated prevalence of 1:1,000,000. It is characterised by intractable diarrhoea, beginning in first few weeks of life; characteristic hair abnormalities, "woolly" and brittle hair, intrauterine growth restriction and characteristic facial dysmorphisms. Other associations are hepatic dysfunction, skin abnormalities, intellectual disability and immunodeficiency. Less common findings include platelet abnormalities and congenital heart defects.

There are two causative genes, SKIV2L (in 1/3 of patients) and TTC37 (2/3 of patients), both encode for proteins in the Ski complex and clinically they are indistinguishable from each other.

Inherited in an autosomal recessive manner with complete penetrance, approximately 2/3rd of patients are homozygotes and 1/3rd are compound heterozygous. Mutations are spread throughout the gene with no identifiable hotspot and generally consist of frameshift, missense and nonsense mutations; a smaller number are splice site mutations. There is no clear genotype/phenotype correlation with overall disease severity, even siblings with the same homozygous mutation display variable phenotypes. Patients have been described globally in Europe, Saudi Arabia, Malaysia, China and Japan.

Intractable watery diarrhoea is a near consistent feature in almost all described cases, almost always starting soon after birth and commonly requiring parenteral nutrition. In cases which do not require parenteral nutrition an elemental diet and supplemental feeding is required.

The majority of SKIV2L pathogenic variant harbouring patients are small at birth (<10th centile) and remain growth restricted despite increased nutrition. Hair abnormalities are seen in >90% of patients and are described as woolly, brittle hair that is easily removed.

Facial dysmorphisms are found in most patients and become more apparent with age. These include a large forehead, broad base of the nose and hypertelorism. Overall the facial features are described as "coarse".

Liver disease is reported frequently in SKIV2L patients (>80%), ranging from fibrosis, cirrhosis, hepatomegaly and raised liver enzymes. Histopathology when performed shows iron overload and can be consistent with haemochromatosis.

Skin abnormalities are frequently reported and are variable including café au lait lesions, haemangiomas and xerosis. A report from Saudi Arabia suggested the skin changes were more frequent in the lower limb and pelvic region of their regional cohort.

Immunodeficiency is reported in some patients. It is poorly delineated and mainly consists of low immunoglobulins and inadequate vaccine responses, however hyper IgA has also been reported. Immunoglobulin therapy has been shown to lower rates of infection.

Less commonly congenital cardiac defects have been reported, mostly ventricular septal defects (VSD), atrial septal defects (ASD), and rarely Tetralogy of Fallot and peripheral pulmonary stenosis.

=== Mortality rate ===
Initially reported as high as 62.5% with most deaths in the first year, more recent reports have estimated mortality of around 30%, which is similar to other disorders which are dependent on parenteral nutrition.

== Recommended treatment and surveillance ==
No specific treatments are available for THES. The goal is to maximise weight gain and reduce infection rates.

Most children require parenteral nutrition (PN) which can be combined with oral feeding, most commonly a semi-elemental diet which allows patients to become independent of PN over time. Nutrition and growth should be closely monitored. If PN is not required, reports have described the use of an amino acid based formula, although it is unclear if weight gain was adequate.

Immunoglobulin levels and vaccine responses should be tested. If any abnormalities are found then a paediatric immunologist should be consulted and intravenous immunoglobulin (IVIG) can be considered to reduce chance of systemic infections. Infection was reported as a cause of death in 20% of a large cohort of French patients.

A recent study looked at immunodeficiency in 9 THES patients, of which 3 had SKIV2L pathogenic variants. The authors reported that the degranulation and number of IFN-γ producing NK cells were reduced in most patients (although it is unclear if this included the SKIV2L patients) and proposed that this could lead to susceptibility to RNA viruses, with 4/9 patients harbouring a chronic EBV infection and one patient dying of measles.

Regular liver assessment should include ultrasound and hepatic enzymes and developmental assessment should be performed.

Steroids, immunosuppressants and haematopoietic stem cell transplant has been THES with no success and therefore it is not recommended.

Genetic counselling should be offered as a sibling recurrence is 25% with each conception.

== Age related macular degeneration (ARMD) ==
An intronic single nucleotide polymorphism (SNP) in SKIV2L on genome wide association studies has been shown to be protective for age related macular degeneration. 3'UTR variant in SKIV2L has recently been reported to exert a protective effect in polypoidal choroidal vasculopathy, a haemorrhagic macular disease that shares some features with neovascular ARMD. As the variants would not affect structure of the protein, it was proposed that it affects regulation of oxidative stress pathways.

Conversely another study showed a genetic variant rs429608 to be strongly associated with the development of ARMD in the Han Chinese population, however further studies are needed to investigate the biological role of SKIV2L and pathogenesis.
