= CDC73 =

Protein-coding gene in humans

Identifiers
- Aliases: CDC73, C1orf28, FIHP, HPTJT, HRPT1, HRPT2, HYX, cell division cycle 73
- External IDs: OMIM: 607393; MGI: 2384876; GeneCards: CDC73

Gene location (Human)
Chr.	Chromosome 1 (human)
Band	1q31.2	Start	193,121,983 bp
Band	1q31.2	End	193,254,815 bp

Gene location (Mouse)
Chr.	Chromosome 1 (mouse)
Band	1 F|1 62.52 cM	Start	143,474,538 bp
Band	1 F|1 62.52 cM	End	143,578,631 bp
RNA expression pattern
Bgee	Human / Mouse (ortholog); Top expressed in: Achilles tendon; sural nerve; epithelium of colon; monocyte; ventricular zone; islet of Langerhans; stromal cell of endometrium; gonad; tail of epididymis; right ventricle / Top expressed in: tail of embryo; genital tubercle; ventricular zone; seminal vesicula; cumulus cell; primitive streak; epiblast; medial ganglionic eminence; yolk sac; Gonadal ridge; More reference expression data
BioGPS	n/a
Gene ontology
Molecular function	RNA polymerase II complex binding; protein binding
Cellular component	nucleoplasm; Cdc73/Paf1 complex; nucleus; cytosol
Biological process	histone monoubiquitination; regulation of transcription, DNA-templated; positive regulation of mRNA 3'-end processing; histone modification; negative regulation of transcription by RNA polymerase II; Wnt signaling pathway; transcription, DNA-templated; stem cell population maintenance; negative regulation of G1/S transition of mitotic cell cycle; positive regulation of Wnt signaling pathway; mRNA polyadenylation; endodermal cell fate commitment; protein destabilization; negative regulation of epithelial cell proliferation; cell cycle; histone H2B ubiquitination; cellular response to lipopolysaccharide; negative regulation of myeloid cell differentiation; negative regulation of fibroblast proliferation; positive regulation of transcription elongation from RNA polymerase II promoter; negative regulation of cell population proliferation; positive regulation of transcription by RNA polymerase II; beta-catenin-TCF complex assembly; regulation of cell growth; regulation of transcription by RNA polymerase II; transcription by RNA polymerase II; transcription elongation from RNA polymerase II promoter; protein ubiquitination; recruitment of 3'-end processing factors to RNA polymerase II holoenzyme complex; negative regulation of apoptotic process; positive regulation of cell cycle G1/S phase transition
Sources:Amigo / QuickGO
Orthologs
Databases	NCBI: entry; OMA: entry
Species	Human	Mouse
Entrez	79577	214498
Ensembl	ENSG00000134371	ENSMUSG00000026361
UniProt	Q6P1J9	Q8JZM7
RefSeq (mRNA)	NM_024529	NM_145991
RefSeq (protein)	NP_078805	NP_666103
Location (UCSC)	Chr 1: 193.12 – 193.25 Mb	Chr 1: 143.47 – 143.58 Mb
PubMed search
- Wikidata
View/Edit Human	View/Edit Mouse

Parafibromin, also called Cell division cycle 73, is a protein which in humans is encoded by the CDC73 gene. CDC73 is part of the PAF1 complex.

== Function ==
Parafibromin, LEO1, PAF1, and CTR9 form the PAF protein complex, which associates with the RNA polymerase II subunit POLR2A and with a histone methyltransferase complex.

== Clinical significance ==
Mutations in the CDC73 gene are associated with hyperparathyroidism-jaw tumor syndrome (HPT-JT) and parathyroid carcinomas.

== See also ==
- Primary hyperparathyroidism
- Osteitis fibrosa cystica
