= DeSanto =

DeSanto or Desanto is a surname, commonly used in English-speaking countries. Notable people with the surname include:

- Austin DeSanto (born 1998), American wrestler
- Daniel DeSanto, Canadian actor
- Karen DeSanto (born 1964), American educator, Democratic politician, and former entertainer
- Michael Desanto (born 1953), Australian Paralympic athlete
- Sugar Pie DeSanto (1935–2024), American R&B singer and dancer
- Tom DeSanto (born 1968), American film producer and screenwriter

== See also ==
- DeSanto-Shinawi syndrome, a rare genetic disorder
