= Ski complex =

Protein complex found in humans and yeast

The Ski complex (or Superkiller Complex) is a multi-protein complex found in many organisms including humans and yeast. In yeast, it is involved in the 3' end degradation of messenger RNAs. The Ski genes were first discovered due to mutations in yeast that led to an excessive expression of killer toxin.

== Structure ==
The complex consists of three main proteins, the RNA helicase Ski2 and the proteins Ski3 and Ski8. In yeast, this tetramer contains a 370 kDa core complex, containing N-terminal arms and C-terminal arms from Ski3. The helicase core of Ski2 is positioned by both the C-terminal of Ski3 and two subunits of Ski8.

== Mechanism ==
Helicase activities are initiated by the N-terminal arm and the Ski2 insertion domain. In yeast, the complex guides RNA molecules to the exosome complex for degradation via a fourth protein, called Ski7, which contains a GTPase-like protein. Ski7 involves the 3’ to 5’ degradation of RNA through two different pathways, 3’ poly(A) tail shortening and the binding of the Ski2, Ski3, and Ski8 tetramer and the exosome.

Degradation of the 3' mRNA overhang occurs by association with the 80s ribosome. The 3' end of the mRNA is threaded through the ribosome to Ski2, preparing it for the degradation process.

Biochemical studies also show that the Ski complex can thread RNA through the exosome complex, thereby coupling the Ski2 protein helicase function with the exoribonuclease activity, leading to degradation of the RNA strand.

== See also ==
- TRAMP complex
- Non-stop decay
- Nonsense mediated decay
