= Proud syndrome =

- Other names: Proud Levine Carpenter syndrome
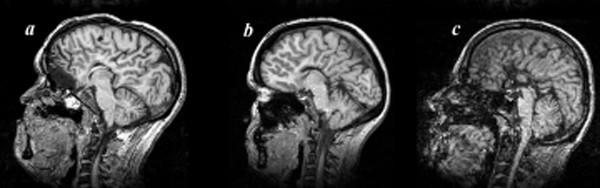
- Specialty: Medical genetics
- Symptoms: intellectual disabilities, brain anomalies and seizures
- Usual onset: Birth
- Duration: Lifelong
- Types: It belongs to a group of disorders which are associated with the ARX gene
- Causes: Genetic mutation
- Differential diagnosis: Idiopathic intellectual disability
- Prevention: none
- Prognosis: Medium
- Frequency: Very rare, only 37 cases have been described in medical literature
- Deaths: -

Proud syndrome is a very rare genetic disorder which is characterized by severe intellectual disabilities, corpus callosum agenesis, epilepsy, and spasticity. It is a type of syndromic X-linked intellectual disability.

== Signs and symptoms ==
The following list comprises the symptoms this disorder causes:

- Corpus callosum agenesis
- Severe intellectual disabilities: IQ between 20 and 34
- Microcephaly
- Epilepsy
- Severe developmental delays
- Short stature
- Spasticity
- Dystonia
- Limb contractures
- Hypospadias
- Cryptorchidism
- Renal dysplasia
- Intersex genitalia
- Scoliosis
- Supraorbital ridge prominence
- Unibrows
- Large eyes
- Hirsutism
- Nystagmus
- Large ears
- Strabismus
- Optic atrophy
- Inguinal hernia

Symptoms list consists of combined information from GARD and OrphaNet, people with the disorder may not always have all the symptoms.

== Causes ==
This condition is caused by X-linked recessive mutations in the ARX gene, in chromosome Xp21.3. Affected males often have symptoms which are more severe than the rare affected females. This gene is thought to be important in interneuronal migration, neuronal proliferation and embryonic brain and testes differentiation.

== Epidemiology ==
According to OMIM, only 37 cases have been described in medical literature.
