= Blepharophimosis-ptosis-esotropia-syndactyly-short stature syndrome =

Very rare genetic disorder

- Other names: Frydman Cohen Karmon syndrome, Blepharophimosis — ptosis — esotropia — syndactyly — short stature
- "Blepharophimosis-ptosis-esotropia-syndactyly-short stature syndrome" follows an autosomal recessive inheritance pattern
- Specialty: Medical genetics
- Symptoms: Short stature, minor congenital anomalies, facial dysmorphisms, muscle weakness, blepharophimosis, and ptosis

Blepharophimosis-ptosis-esotropia-syndactyly-short stature syndrome is a very rare genetic and congenital disorder which is characterized by blepharophimosis, ptosis, V-esotropia, foot syndactyly, extra-ocular and frontal muscles weakness, low height/short stature, prognathism, and synophrys.

Only six cases from three consanguineous families across the world have been reported in medical literature. This disorder follows an autosomal recessive inheritance pattern.

Less commonly, anosmia, moderate intellectual disability, hypertelorism, and increased thickness of lower lips and eyebrows can also appear as symptoms of the syndrome
