= RTF1 =

Protein

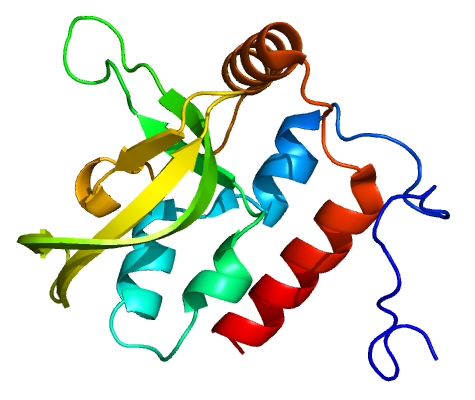

Identifiers
- Aliases: RTF1, GTL7, KIAA0252, RTF1 homolog, Paf1/RNA polymerase II complex component
- External IDs: OMIM: 611633; MGI: 1309480; GeneCards: RTF1
Available structures
PDB	Ortholog search: PDBe RCSB
PDB	List of PDB id codes 2BZE, 2DB9, 3U1U, 4L1P, 4L1U

Gene location (Human)
Chr.	Chromosome 15 (human)
Band	15q15.1	Start	41,408,408 bp
Band	15q15.1	End	41,483,563 bp

Gene location (Mouse)
Chr.	Chromosome 2 (mouse)
Band	2|2 E5	Start	119,675,068 bp
Band	2|2 E5	End	119,735,407 bp
RNA expression pattern
Bgee	Human / Mouse (ortholog); Top expressed in: ganglionic eminence; Skeletal muscle tissue of rectus abdominis; palpebral conjunctiva; epithelium of colon; ventricular zone; bone marrow cell; cerebellar hemisphere; Skeletal muscle tissue of biceps brachii; body of tongue; monocyte / Top expressed in: tail of embryo; zygote; genital tubercle; hand; yolk sac; superior cervical ganglion; foot; interventricular septum; primitive streak; fossa; More reference expression data
BioGPS	n/a
Gene ontology
Molecular function	protein binding; single-stranded DNA binding; DNA binding; RNA polymerase II C-terminal domain phosphoserine binding; RNA binding
Cellular component	nucleolus; nucleus; Cdc73/Paf1 complex; nucleoplasm
Biological process	blastocyst growth; histone modification; regulation of transcription, DNA-templated; positive regulation of transcription elongation from RNA polymerase II promoter; histone H3-K4 trimethylation; positive regulation of histone H3-K4 methylation; transcription, DNA-templated; Wnt signaling pathway; positive regulation of transcription by RNA polymerase II; negative regulation of transcription by RNA polymerase II; stem cell population maintenance; endodermal cell fate commitment; transcription by RNA polymerase II; transcription elongation from RNA polymerase II promoter; protein ubiquitination
Sources:Amigo / QuickGO
Orthologs
Databases	NCBI: entry; OMA: entry
Species	Human	Mouse
Entrez	23168	76246
Ensembl	ENSG00000137815	ENSMUSG00000027304
UniProt	Q92541	A2AQ19
RefSeq (mRNA)	NM_015138	NM_030112
RefSeq (protein)	NP_055953	NP_084388
Location (UCSC)	Chr 15: 41.41 – 41.48 Mb	Chr 2: 119.68 – 119.74 Mb
PubMed search
- Wikidata
View/Edit Human	View/Edit Mouse

Rtf1, Paf1/RNA polymerase II complex component, homolog (S. cerevisiae) is a protein that in humans is encoded by the RTF1 gene. As its name suggests, this protein is part of the Paf1/RNA polymerase II complex, a multi-subunit complex involved in regulating DNA to RNA transcription by RNA polymerase II.

This locus may represent a gene involved in regulation of transcription elongation and chromatin remodeling, based on studies of similar proteins in other organisms. The encoded protein may bind single-stranded DNA.

== See also ==
- RTF2
