= Non-stop mRNA decay =

Diagram of non-stop decay (NSD) process.

Non-stop decay (NSD) is a cellular mechanism of mRNA surveillance to detect mRNA molecules lacking a stop codon and prevent these mRNAs from translation. The non-stop decay pathway releases ribosomes that have reached the far 3' end of an mRNA and guides the mRNA to the exosome complex, or to RNase R in bacteria for selective degradation. In contrast to nonsense-mediated decay (NMD), polypeptides do not release from the ribosome, and thus, NSD seems to involve mRNA decay factors distinct from NMD.

== Mechanism ==
Non-stop decay (NSD) is a cellular pathway that identifies and degrades aberrant mRNA transcripts that do not contain a proper stop codon. Stop codons are signals in messenger RNA that signal for synthesis of proteins to end. Aberrant transcripts are identified during translation when the ribosome translates into the poly A tail at the 3' end of mRNA. A non-stop transcript can occur when point mutations damage the normal stop codon. Moreover, some transcriptional events are more likely to preserve gene expression on a lower scale in particular states.

The NSD pathway discharges ribosomes that have stalled at the 3' end of mRNA and directs the mRNA to the exosome complex in eukaryotes or RNase R in bacteria. Once directed to their appropriate sites, the transcripts are then degraded. In Saccharomyces cerevisiae, the NSD mechanism requires the interaction of RNA exosome with the Ski complex, a multi-protein structure that includes the Ski2p helicase and (notably) Ski7p. The combination of these proteins and subsequent complex formation activates the degradation of aberrant mRNAs. Ski7p is thought to bind the ribosome stalled at the 3’ end of the mRNA poly(A) tail and recruit the exosome to degrade the aberrant mRNA.

=== In mammalian cells ===
Ski7p is not found in mammalian cells, and even the presence of the NSD mechanism itself has remained relatively unclear. In vitro, one study has shown decreased levels of a non-stop β-glucuronidase reporter in HeLa cells, while another study demonstrated no difference in mRNA levels or stability between a wild-type vs non-stop mutant GFP reporter in the same cell line. One case of Diamond-Blackfan anemia was reported with a mutant RPS19 lacking a stop codon, where mRNA levels were significantly lower than wild-type RPS19 from a healthy control. However, a case of mitochondrial neurogastrointestinal encephalopathy (MNGIE) was reported with mutant non-stop TYMP mRNA at the same levels of wild-type TYMP in both the homozygous patient and heterozygous carriers.

The GTPase Hbs1, as well as its binding partner Dom34, were identified as potential regulators of decay. Together, Hbs1/Dom34 are capable of binding to the 3’ end of an mis-regulated mRNA, facilitating the dissociation of malfunctioning or inactive ribosomes in order to restart the process of translation. In addition, once the Hbs1/Dom34 complex has dissociated and recycled a ribosome, it has also been shown to recruit the exosome/Ski complex. The short splicing isoform of HBS1L (HBS1LV3) was found to be the long-sought after human homologue of Ski7p, linking the exosome and SKI complexes.

=== In bacteria ===
In bacteria, trans-translation, a highly conserved mechanism, acts as a direct counter to the accumulation of non-stop RNA, inducing decay and liberating the misregulated ribosome. Originally discovered in Escherichia coli, the process of trans-translation is made possible by the interactions between transfer-messenger RNA (tmRNA) and the cofactor protein SmpB, which allows for the stable binding of the tmRNA to the stalled ribosome. The current tmRNA model states that tmRNA and SmpB interact together in order to mimic tRNA. The SmpB protein recognizes the point of stalling, and directs the tmRNA to bind to the ribosomal A site. Once bound, SmpB engages in a transpeptidation reaction with the improperly functioning polypeptide chain through the donation of charged alanine. Through this process, the stalled and defective mRNA sequence is replaced with the SmpB RNA sequence, which encodes for the addition of an 11 amino acid tag on the C-terminus of the mRNA, which promotes degradation. The modified portion of RNA, along with the amino acid tag, are translated, and demonstrate incomplete characteristics, alerting and allowing for intracellular proteases to remove these harmful protein fragments, causing stalled ribosomes on damaged mRNA to resume function.

=== mRNA degradation ===
Many enzymes and proteins play a role in degrading mRNA. For example, in Escherichia coli there are three enzymes: RNase II, PNPase, and RNase R. RNase R is a 3’-5’ exoribonuclease that is recruited to degrade a defective mRNA. RNase R has two structural domains, an N-terminal putative helix-turn-helix (HTH) and a C-terminal lysine(K-rich) domain. These two domains are unique to RNase R, and are attributed as being the determining factors for the selectivity and specificity of the protein. Evidence has been shown that the K-rich domain is involved in the degradation of non-stop mRNA. These domains are not present in other RNases. Both RNase II and RNase R are members of RNR family, and they share a noteworthy similarity in primary sequence and domain architecture. However, RNase R has the ability to efficiently degrade mRNA, while RNase II has less efficiency in the degrading process. Nevertheless, the specific mechanics of degrading mRNA via RNase R has remained a mystery.
