= Replication termination factor 2 =

Protein-coding gene in the species Homo sapiens

RTF2

Identifiers
- Aliases: RTF2, C20orf43, CDAO5, HSPC164, SHUJUN-3, replication termination factor 2 domain containing 1, replication termination factor 2, RTFDC1
- External IDs: MGI: 1913654; GeneCards: RTF2

Gene location (Human)
Chr.	Chromosome 20 (human)
Band	20q13.31	Start	56,468,585 bp
Band	20q13.31	End	56,519,449 bp

Gene location (Mouse)
Chr.	Chromosome 2 (mouse)
Band	2|2 H3	Start	172,282,476 bp
Band	2|2 H3	End	172,311,828 bp
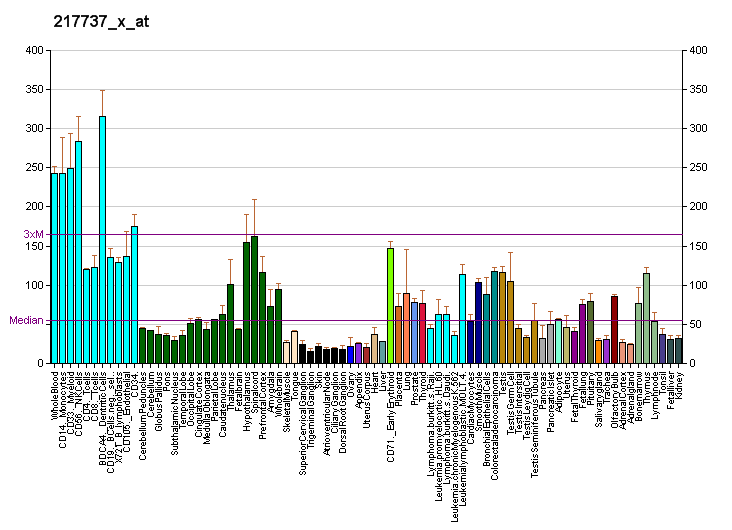
RNA expression pattern
Bgee	Human / Mouse (ortholog); Top expressed in: Achilles tendon; monocyte; popliteal artery; gastrocnemius muscle; ganglionic eminence; prefrontal cortex; caudate nucleus; ascending aorta; left coronary artery; right coronary artery / Top expressed in: spermatid; granulocyte; lip; spermatocyte; dentate gyrus of hippocampal formation granule cell; left lobe of liver; neural tube; thymus; lumbar spinal ganglion; ventricular zone; More reference expression data
BioGPS	More reference expression data
Gene ontology
Molecular function	molecular function; DNA binding; protein binding
Cellular component	nucleus; cellular component; replication fork; chromosome
Biological process	mitotic DNA replication termination; site-specific DNA replication termination at RTS1 barrier; biological process; cellular response to hydroxyurea; regulation of DNA stability
Sources:Amigo / QuickGO
Orthologs
Databases	NCBI: entry; OMA: entry
Species	Human	Mouse
Entrez	51507	66404
Ensembl	ENSG00000022277	ENSMUSG00000027502
UniProt	Q9BY42	Q99K95
RefSeq (mRNA)	NM_001283035; NM_001283036; NM_001283037; NM_016407	NM_025542; NM_175297
RefSeq (protein)	NP_001269964; NP_001269965; NP_001269966; NP_057491	NP_079818
Location (UCSC)	Chr 20: 56.47 – 56.52 Mb	Chr 2: 172.28 – 172.31 Mb
PubMed search
- Wikidata
View/Edit Human	View/Edit Mouse

Replication termination factor 2 is a protein that in humans is encoded by the RTF2 gene. The RTF2 protein is a DNA binding protein that research suggests plays a role in DNA damage response and repair, but its precise functions remains uncertain.

== See also ==
- RTF1
