= Trichoptilosis =

Splitting or fraying of hair

- Other names: Split ends, Schizotrichia
- A human hair severely affected by trichoptilosis due to mechanical stress
- Specialty: Dermatology
- Symptoms: Broken hairs
- Complications: Infection
- Duration: Lifetime
- Types: Central Trichoptilosis, Trichorrhexis nodosa
- Causes: Mechanical stress; genetics; chemical stress; vitamin deficiency;
- Risk factors: Genetics; use of hair dye; knotted hair; Menkes disease; occipital horn syndrome
- Prevention: Hair Hygiene, avoidance of stressors, vitamins
- Treatment: Removal of affected hair
- Frequency: Common; affects all with hair

Trichoptilosis (from the Greek τριχο- tricho- "hair" and the New Latin ptilosis "arrangement of feathers in definite areas" from the Greek πτίλον ptilon "feather"), schizotrichia, and informally split ends, is the splitting or fraying of the hair-shaft due to excessive heat and mechanical stress. This condition occurs when the outer layer of the hair is damaged and the hair fibre divide into two or more strands.

== Types of split ends ==
=== Double split ===
The most common type of split ends, where the single hair forks into two.

=== Feather split ===
In this type of split ends, the hair appears feathered at the end, with multiple splits splaying out.

=== Tree split ===
In this type, the ends branch out multiple times, resembling branches of a tree.

=== Knot split ===
The hair has a bulb at the end, becoming thicker at the tip.

== Causes ==
Thermal, chemical or mechanical stress can cause split ends. For example, the use of curling irons and other heat treatments may cause split ends. Excessive application of hair products such as perms and hair coloring may strip protective layering off the outside of the hair's shaft and weaken the hair, making the hair prone to split ends. Mechanical stresses include pulling a comb forcefully through tangled hair and repeated combing. Split ends can be a symptom of copper transport disorders such as Menkes disease and occipital horn syndrome. Rubbing the hair up towards the scalp does not cause split ends.

Split ends in different lengths

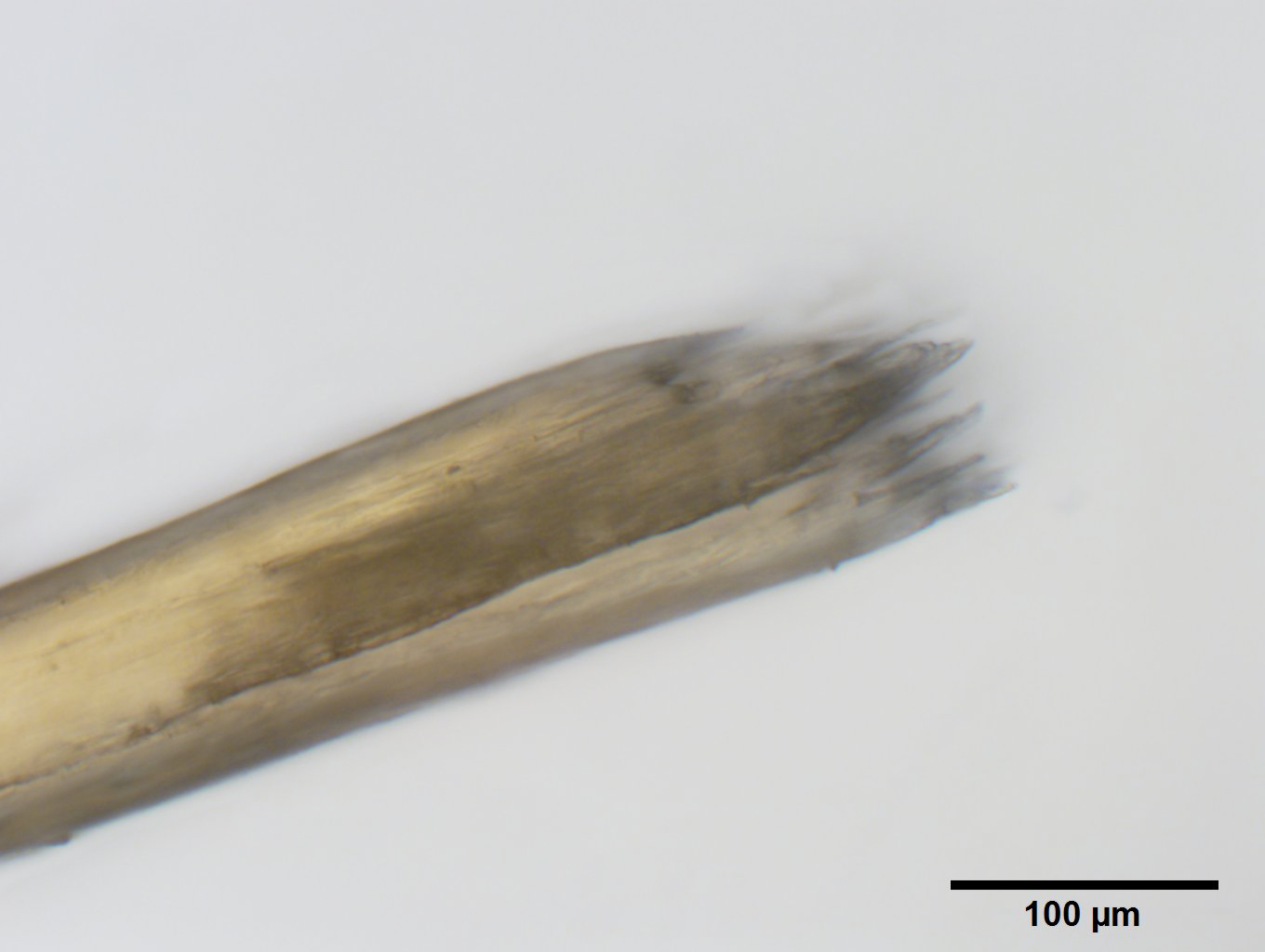

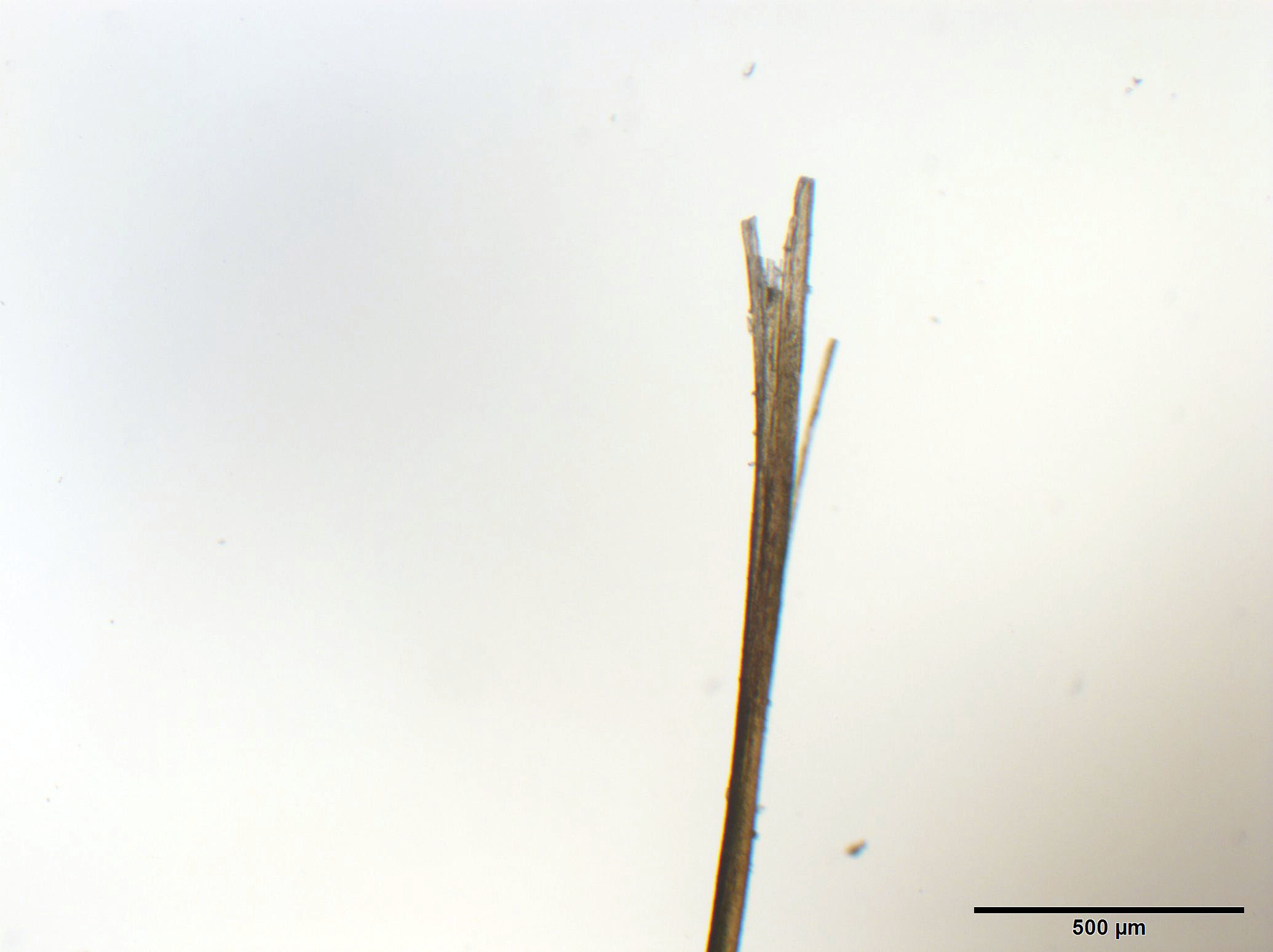

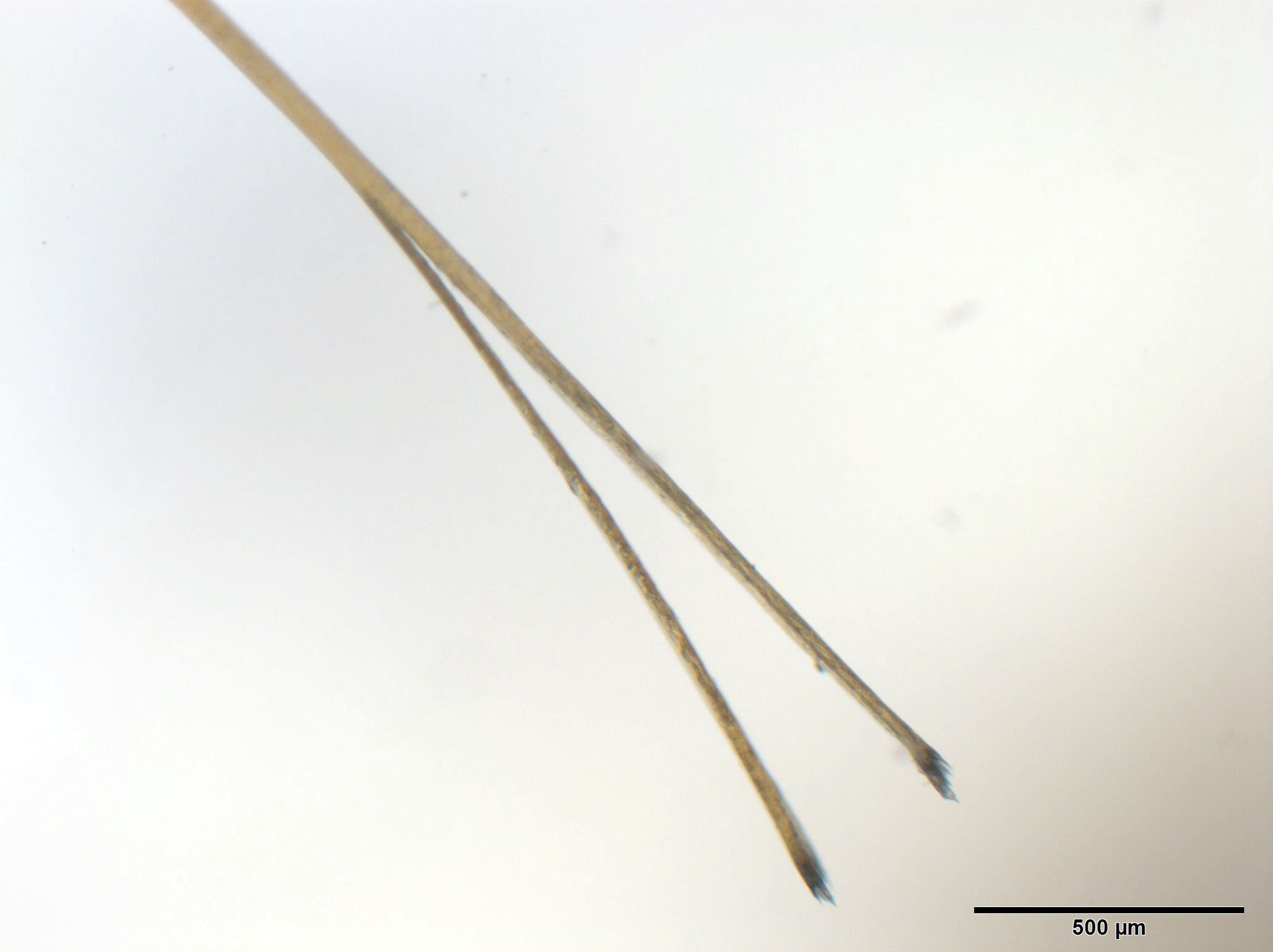

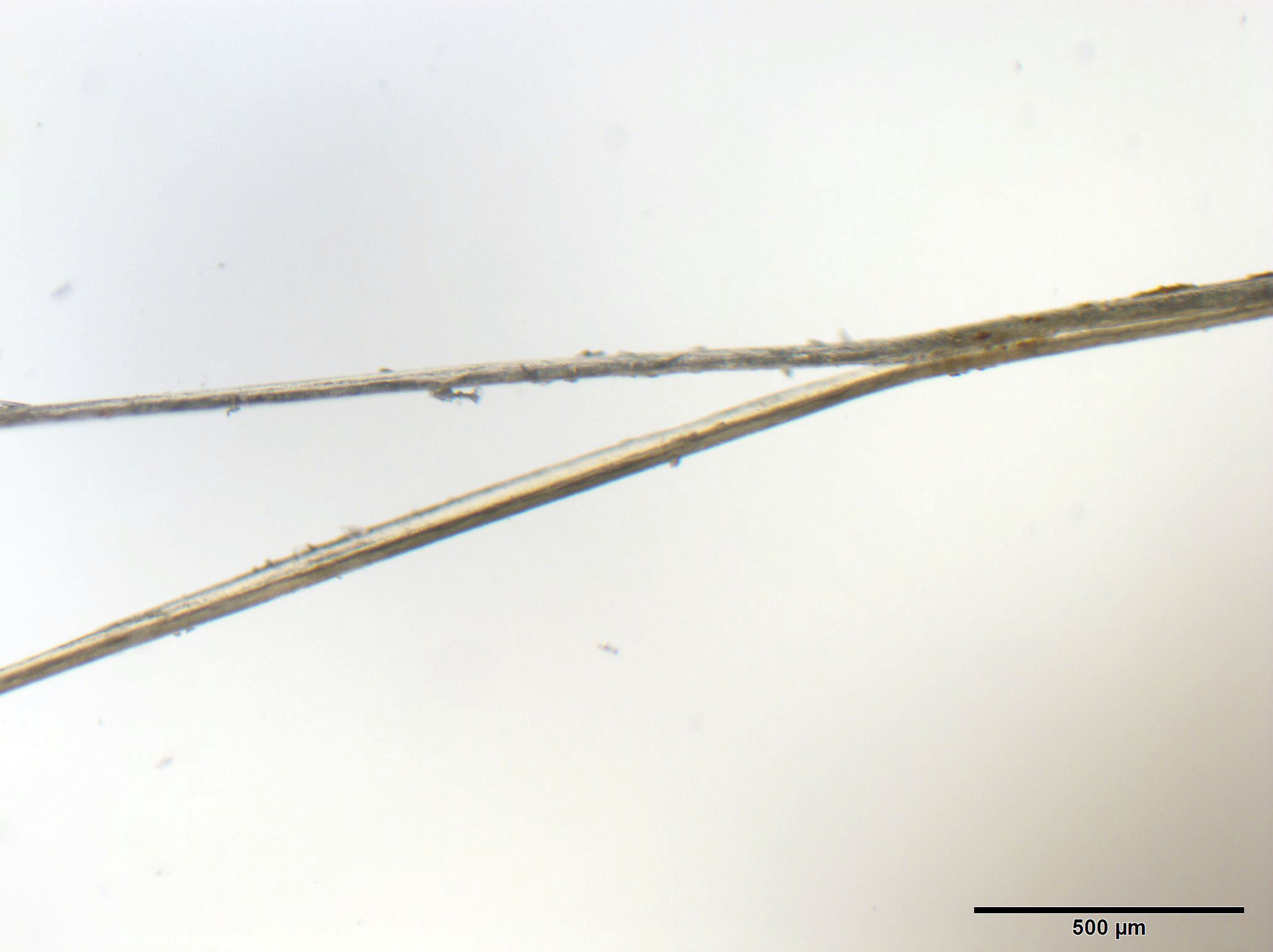

== See also ==
- Trichorrhexis nodosa, sometimes referred to as "bamboo hair", is caused by a genetic condition.
