= HBS1-like protein =

Protein-coding gene in the species Homo sapiens

HBS1L

Identifiers
- Aliases: HBS1L, EF-1a, ERFS, HBS1, HSPC276, eRF3c, HBS1 like translational GTPase
- External IDs: OMIM: 612450; MGI: 1891704; GeneCards: HBS1L
Available structures
PDB	Ortholog search: PDBe RCSB
PDB	List of PDB id codes 1UFZ

Gene location (Human)
Chr.	Chromosome 6 (human)
Band	6q23.3	Start	134,960,378 bp
Band	6q23.3	End	135,103,056 bp

Gene location (Mouse)
Chr.	Chromosome 10 (mouse)
Band	10|10 A3	Start	21,171,878 bp
Band	10|10 A3	End	21,244,797 bp
RNA expression pattern
Bgee	Human / Mouse (ortholog); Top expressed in: Achilles tendon; gastrocnemius muscle; C1 segment; muscle of thigh; ventricular zone; islet of Langerhans; ganglionic eminence; epithelium of colon; stromal cell of endometrium; triceps brachii muscle / Top expressed in: spermatid; spermatocyte; lens; vastus lateralis muscle; cardiac muscle tissue of left ventricle; digastric muscle; ventricular zone; sternocleidomastoid muscle; epiblast; primitive streak; More reference expression data
BioGPS	n/a
Gene ontology
Molecular function	nucleotide binding; GTP binding; GTPase activity; translation elongation factor activity; protein binding
Cellular component	extracellular exosome; intracellular anatomical structure; membrane; cytosol
Biological process	translational elongation; protein biosynthesis; signal transduction; exonucleolytic catabolism of deadenylated mRNA
Sources:Amigo / QuickGO
Orthologs
Databases	NCBI: entry; OMA: entry
Species	Human	Mouse
Entrez	10767	56422
Ensembl	ENSG00000112339	ENSMUSG00000019977
UniProt	Q9Y450	Q69ZS7
RefSeq (mRNA)	NM_001145158; NM_001145207; NM_006620; NM_001363686	NM_001042593; NM_001145209; NM_019702
RefSeq (protein)	NP_001138630; NP_001138679; NP_006611; NP_001350615; NP_006611.1	NP_001036058; NP_001138681; NP_062676
Location (UCSC)	Chr 6: 134.96 – 135.1 Mb	Chr 10: 21.17 – 21.24 Mb
PubMed search
- Wikidata
View/Edit Human	View/Edit Mouse

HBS1-like protein (also HBS1 like translational GTPase) is a protein that in humans is encoded by the HBS1L gene.

== Function ==
This gene encodes a member of the GTP-binding elongation factor family. It is expressed in multiple tissues with the highest expression in heart and skeletal muscle. The intergenic region of this gene and the MYB gene has been identified to be a quantitative trait locus (QTL) controlling fetal hemoglobin level, and this region influences erythrocyte, platelet, and monocyte counts as well as erythrocyte volume and hemoglobin content. DNA polymorphisms at this region associate with fetal hemoglobin levels and pain crises in sickle cell disease. A single nucleotide polymorphism in exon 1 of this gene is significantly associated with severity in beta-thalassemia/Hemoglobin E. Multiple alternatively spliced transcript variants encoding different protein isoforms have been found for this gene.
