= Trichorrhexis nodosa =

- Other names: Hair shaft fracture
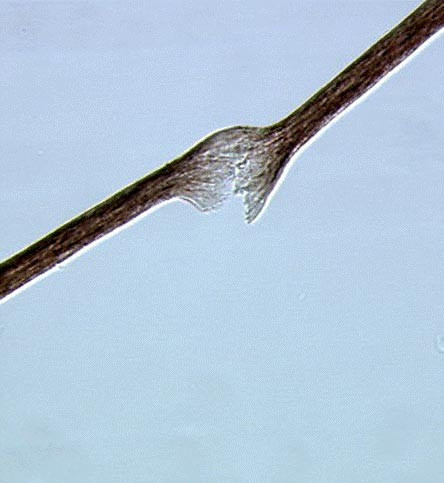
- Tricho-hepato-enteric syndrome: Microscopic analysis of the hair shaft showing breaks located at nodes in the hair (trichorrhexis nodosa) and longitudinal breaks.
- Specialty: Dermatology

Trichorrhexis nodosa is a defect in the hair shaft characterized by thickening or weak points (nodes) that cause the hair to break off easily. This group of conditions contributes to the appearance of hair loss, lack of growth, and damaged-looking hair.

== Symptoms ==
Among the symptoms (and signs) for this condition are the following:

- lack of apparent hair growth
- hair appears patchy
- hair breaks easily close to scalp
- hair may have thickenings or nodes in the shaft
- ends of hair thinned or split
- whitish discoloration of hair tips
- hair breaks easily at tips

=== Complications ===
This condition is not dangerous but may affect self-esteem.

== Causes ==
Trichorrhexis may have a genetic basis but appears to be precipitated by environmental factors. Among Caucasians the defect often appears at the ends of the hair shaft with splitting of the ends, thinning and whitish discoloration.

These conditions are directly related to environmental causes such as "perming", blow drying, aggressive hair brushing, and excessive chemical exposure.

In some cases, trichorrhexis nodosa may be caused by an underlying disorder such as argininosuccinic aciduria, Menkes' kinky hair syndrome, Netherton's syndrome, hypothyroidism, or trichothiodystrophy.

== Diagnosis ==
Examination of the hair shafts with a microscope may reveal changes of trichorrhexis nodosa.

== Prevention ==
Avoid aggressive brushing and grooming, strong chemicals, permanents, straightening, and similar hair-damaging habits.

== Treatment ==
Improving environmental factors will reduce damage to the hair. Gentle brushing with a soft brush should replace more aggressive brushing, ratting, or other procedures. Harsh chemicals such as hair straightening compounds and permanents should be avoided. The hair should not be ironed. Excessively harsh shampoo should be avoided. Hair conditioners should be used.

== Prognosis ==
This condition is self-limiting. Improvements in grooming techniques and in environmental conditions will correct the abnormality.

== See also ==
- Trichomegaly
- List of cutaneous conditions
