= DeSanto–Shinawi syndrome =

- Specialty: Neurology, medical genetics
- Symptoms: Specific developmental disorder, intellectual disability, hypotonia, behavioral abnormalities, facial differences, gastrointestinal and eye abnormalities
- Usual onset: Infancy
- Management: Physical, occupational and speech therapy

DeSanto–Shinawi (DESSH) syndrome is a rare genetic disorder caused by genetic variations (mutations) in a gene called WW Domain-Containing Adaptor with Coiled-coil Region (WAC gene). The condition was first described in 2015 in six individuals. The prevalence of DESSH syndrome is unknown at this time, but 25 individuals have been so far described in the medical literature. However, many other individuals with this condition are being studied and characterized. With the increasing utilization of exome and whole genome sequencing, it is anticipated that many more individuals will be identified.

The condition is characterized by a variable degree of developmental delay and intellectual disability, decreased muscle tone (hypotonia), behavioral abnormalities, some facial differences and gastrointestinal and eye abnormalities.

== Signs and symptoms ==
Individuals with DESSH syndrome present in infancy with nonspecific feeding and gastrointestinal problems, such as constipation, feeding difficulties and gastroesophageal reflux as well as hypotonia. They can also exhibit some eye abnormalities, such as strabismus and refractive errors (nearsightedness), and astigmatism and occasionally recurrent respiratory infections. When children get older, they start showing developmental delay and neurobehavioral difficulties. Gross motor delay is very common; for instance independent walking usually starts around 20–30 months of age. Language acquisition is delayed in almost all individuals with DESSH syndrome. Many patients with DESSH syndrome have cognitive disabilities ranging from mild to moderate. Behavioral problems include ADHD, anxiety, aggressive outbursts and some autistic features. There are cases of autism in this population. Facial features of patients with DESSH syndrome include a broad forehead, bushy eyebrows, depressed nasal bridge and a bulbous nasal tip.

Congenital anomalies were also occasionally reported and include eye, kidney, pelvic and limb anomalies.

Some patients in this grouping experience seizures.

== Genetics ==
The condition is caused by WAC mutations that result in a loss of function via either mRNA decay or protein truncation. Most cases of DESSH syndrome are not inherited and affected people typically have no history of the disorder in their family. The genetic changes in the WAC gene occur as random events during the formation of reproductive cells (eggs and sperm) or in early embryonic development. There are 2–3 familial recurrences due to a presumed germline mosaicism. The condition is inherited in an autosomal dominant manner.

== Diagnosis ==
The diagnosis is usually made on patients by technologies such as exome sequencing or whole exome sequencing. Because of the recognizable facial features in many patients, clinicians may be able to make a clinical diagnosis based on a physical exam, but molecular confirmatory studies are usually needed.

== Treatment ==
Currently there is no cure for DESSH syndrome, and the treatment relies on managing its symptoms. Children with DESSH often require several forms of support, including physical therapy, occupational therapy and speech therapy.

The treatment also involves screening for autism, neurological issues, ocular abnormalities and kidney deficits.

Multiple specialists can be involved in the management of children with DESSH syndrome, including developmental pediatricians, neurologists, gastroenterologists, ophthalmologists, psychologists, psychiatrists and geneticists.
