= Tricho-hepato-enteric syndrome =

- Other names: Intractable diarrhea of infancy with facial dysmorphism
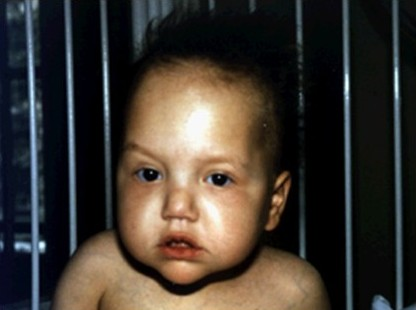
- Typical facial abnormalities with prominent forehead and cheeks, broad nasal root and wide-spaced eyes. Abnormal hairs are woolly, easily removed and poorly pigmented.

Tricho-hepato-enteric syndrome (THE), also known as syndromic or phenotypic diarrhea, is an extremely rare congenital bowel disorder which manifests itself as intractable diarrhea in infants with intrauterine growth retardation, and hair and facial abnormalities. Many also have liver disease and abnormalities of the immune system. The associated malabsorption leads to malnutrition and failure to thrive.

It is thought to be a genetic disorder with an autosomal recessive inheritance pattern, although responsible genes have not been found and the exact cause remains unknown. Prognosis is poor; many patients die before the age of 5 (mainly from infections or cirrhosis), although most patients nowadays survive with intravenous feeding (parenteral nutrition).

== Symptoms ==
Tricho-hepato-enteric syndrome is one particular form of intractable diarrhea of infancy, presenting typically in the first month of life. These babies are usually born small for their age and continue to experience failure to thrive, usually with a final short stature. Typical facial features include prominent forehead and cheeks, a broad nasal root and widely spaced eyes (hypertelorism). Their hairs are woolly, easily removed and poorly pigmented. Liver disease is mainly present as cirrhosis or fibrosis, and staining might reveal high iron content of the liver cells (consistent with hemochromatosis). Most evaluated patients had some degree of decrease in intelligence.

== Genetics ==
The syndrome appears to be due to mutations in the gene tetratricopeptide repeat domain 37 (TTC37), which encodes the protein Thespin or the SKIV2L gene. This gene is expressed in the adrenal gland, amniotic fluid, bladder, blood, bones, bone marrow, brain, cervix, uterus and ovaries (in females), testis, epididymis and prostate (in males), connective tissue, ears, eyes, heart, intestines, kidneys, liver, lungs, lymph nodes, mammary glands (in females), mouth, muscles, nerves, oesophagus, pancreas, pharynx, placenta, pituitary gland, salivary glands, thyroid gland, tonsils, thymus, trachea, skin, spleen, spinal cord, stomach and vascular tissue. It is also expressed in ascites and various embryonic tissues. It is expressed at high level in the intestines, lungs, lymph nodes, pituitary and vascular tissues. This gene is also known as KIAA0372, MGC32587 and TPR repeat protein 37.

This gene is located on the Crick (minus) strand of the long arm of chromosome 5 (5q15). The gene is 91,113 bases in length and encodes a protein of 1564 amino acid residues with twenty tetratricopeptide repeats. It has 43 exons, of which exons 1, 2 and 3 are non coding. The predicted molecular weight of the protein is 175.486 kilodaltons and its predicted pI is 7.47. Its function is unknown, but it may have adenylate cyclase activity and calcium- and calmodulin-responsive adenylate cyclase activity. A homolog has been identified in the frog (Xenopus tropicalis), the mouse (Mus musculus) and the rat (Rattus norvegicus). In the mouse, this gene is located on chromosome 13.

== Diagnosis ==
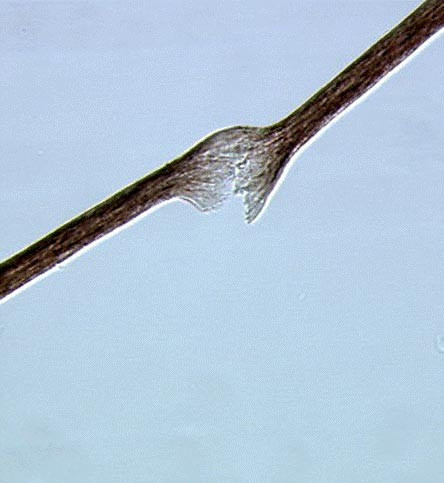
Microscopic analysis of the hair shaft showing breaks located at nodes in the hair (trichorrhexis nodosa) and longitudinal breaks.

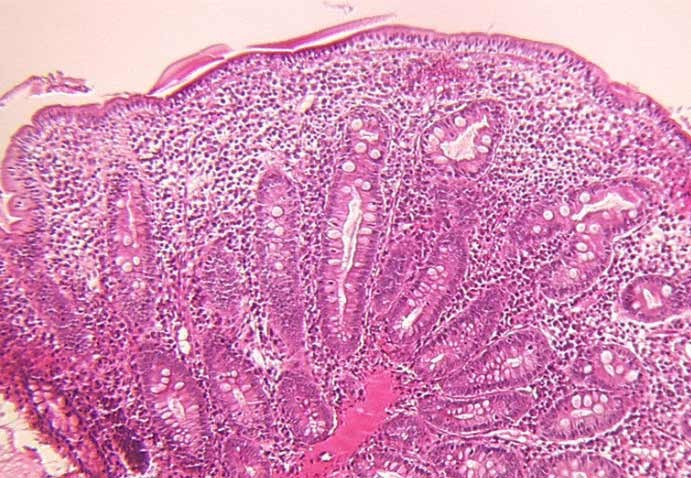
Small intestine biopsy of a patient with THE syndrome showing severe villous atrophy with intense mononuclear cell infiltration in the lamina propria. (Courtesy of Prof. Michel Peuchmaur, Hôpital Robert Debré, Paris, France)

=== Facial features ===
The typical facial features are low-set ears, prominent eyes with hypertelorism, broad flat nose, prominent forehead and large mouth.

=== Liver ===
There may be fibrosis with bile duct proliferation, occasional giant cells and regenerative parenchymal nodules. Siderosis is common.

=== Small bowel ===
Microscopic examination of a biopsy of the small bowel in these patients shows villous atrophy with low or no mononuclear cell infiltration of the lamina propria nor specific abnormalities involving the epithelium. The amount of villous atrophy does not explain the severity of the diarrhea.

Studies of enterocyte brush-border ion transporter proteins (sodium-hydrogen exchanger 2, sodium-hydrogen exchanger 3, aquaporin 7, sodium-iodide symporter and hydrogen potassium ATPase) showed reduced expression or mislocalization in all patients with different profiles for each.

=== Hair ===
Microscopic analysis of the hair shows twisted hairs of unequal size and different shapes (pili torti, aniso- and poikilotrichosis), longitudinal breaks and breaks located at nodes (trichorrhexis nodosa). Scanning electron microscopy might reveal hair budding (trichorrhexis blastysis). Biochemical analysis may reveal sulfur-deficient, brittle hair (trichothiodystrophy; note that disulfide bonds determine hair waviness).

=== Platelets ===
Platelets may be enlarged. The membrane surface connected canalicular system is disrupted with prominent tubules and small membranous vesicles. Alpha granules may be missing from the platelets. Despite these abnormalities there is no increased tendency to bleed in this syndrome.

=== Other ===
More than 90% of patients present immune defects. Low immunoglobulin level, a defect in antibody production after vaccination, monoclonal hyper IgA, and low lymphocyte count have been reported. In these cases, some patients may need immunoglobulin supplementation.

== Treatment ==
No specific treatment or cure exists. Affected children usually need total parenteral nutrition through a central venous catheter. Further worsening of liver damage should, however, be avoided if possible. Diarrhea will likely continue even though food stops passing through the gastrointestinal system. They can subsequently be managed with tube feeding, and some may be weaned from nutritional support during adolescence.

== Epidemiology ==
Tricho-hepato-enteric syndrome is estimated to affect 1 in 300,000 to 400,000 live births in Western Europe. This syndrome was first reported in 1982 with a report on 2 siblings, and as of 2008 there were around 25 published cases in medical journals. There seem to be no racial differences in its occurrence. It might be more common, as many genetic diseases, in areas with high levels of consanguinity.
