= PAF1 =

Identifiers
- Aliases: PAF1, F23149_1, PD2, PAF1 homolog, Paf1/RNA polymerase II complex component
- External IDs: OMIM: 610506; MGI: 1923988; GeneCards: PAF1
Available structures
PDB	Ortholog search: PDBe RCSB
PDB	List of PDB id codes 4M6T

Gene location (Human)
Chr.	Chromosome 19 (human)
Band	19q13.2	Start	39,385,629 bp
Band	19q13.2	End	39,391,154 bp

Gene location (Mouse)
Chr.	Chromosome 7 (mouse)
Band	7|7 A3	Start	28,092,376 bp
Band	7|7 A3	End	28,098,813 bp
RNA expression pattern
Bgee	Human / Mouse (ortholog); Top expressed in: tendon of biceps brachii; sural nerve; left testis; right testis; internal globus pallidus; gastric mucosa; C1 segment; anterior pituitary; ventricular zone; left ovary / Top expressed in: otic vesicle; saccule; otic placode; neural layer of retina; ascending aorta; aortic valve; supraoptic nucleus; yolk sac; interventricular septum; granulocyte; More reference expression data
BioGPS	n/a
Gene ontology
Molecular function	RNA polymerase II complex binding; chromatin binding; protein binding
Cellular component	cytoplasm; membrane; cell junction; Cdc73/Paf1 complex; nucleus; nucleoplasm
Biological process	histone monoubiquitination; regulation of transcription, DNA-templated; positive regulation of histone methylation; positive regulation of mRNA 3'-end processing; histone modification; negative regulation of transcription by RNA polymerase II; Wnt signaling pathway; transcription, DNA-templated; stem cell population maintenance; mRNA polyadenylation; endodermal cell fate commitment; protein localization to nucleus; histone H2B ubiquitination; cellular response to lipopolysaccharide; negative regulation of myeloid cell differentiation; positive regulation of transcription elongation from RNA polymerase II promoter; positive regulation of transcription by RNA polymerase II; transcription by RNA polymerase II; transcription elongation from RNA polymerase II promoter; protein ubiquitination; positive regulation of cell cycle G1/S phase transition
Sources:Amigo / QuickGO
Orthologs
Databases	NCBI: entry; OMA: entry
Species	Human	Mouse
Entrez	54623	54624
Ensembl	ENSG00000006712	ENSMUSG00000003437
UniProt	Q8N7H5	Q8K2T8
RefSeq (mRNA)	NM_001256826; NM_019088	NM_019458
RefSeq (protein)	NP_001243755; NP_061961	NP_062331
Location (UCSC)	Chr 19: 39.39 – 39.39 Mb	Chr 7: 28.09 – 28.1 Mb
PubMed search
- Wikidata
View/Edit Human	View/Edit Mouse

RNA polymerase II-associated factor 1 homolog (PAF1), also called PD2, is a protein that in humans is encoded by the PAF1 gene. This protein is a component of the polymerase associated factor (PAF1) complex, which is involved in the transcription of DNA into mRNA through interaction with RNA Polymerase II. PAF1 is necessary for maintaining the complex's integrity.

== PAF1 complex ==
The polymerase associated factor complex (PAF1C) is a multi-protein subunit complex found in humans and many other organisms (though much of the early research was in budding yeast). This complex functions as a regulator of all stages of RNA Polymerase II-based transcription. For example, the PAF1 Complex promotes transcription elongation through interaction with elongation factors like the DSIF and FACT complexes.

In humans, it is composed of 6 protein subunits: PAF1, CDC73, LEO1, CTR9, RTF1 and SKIC8, which notably differs from yeast by the addition of SKIC8 Both PAF1 and CDC73 seem necessary for maintaining complex integrity, and yeast without Paf1 or Cdc73 suffer severe growth defects.
