= Sofia Harmanda =

Greek tastemaker, ballerina and model

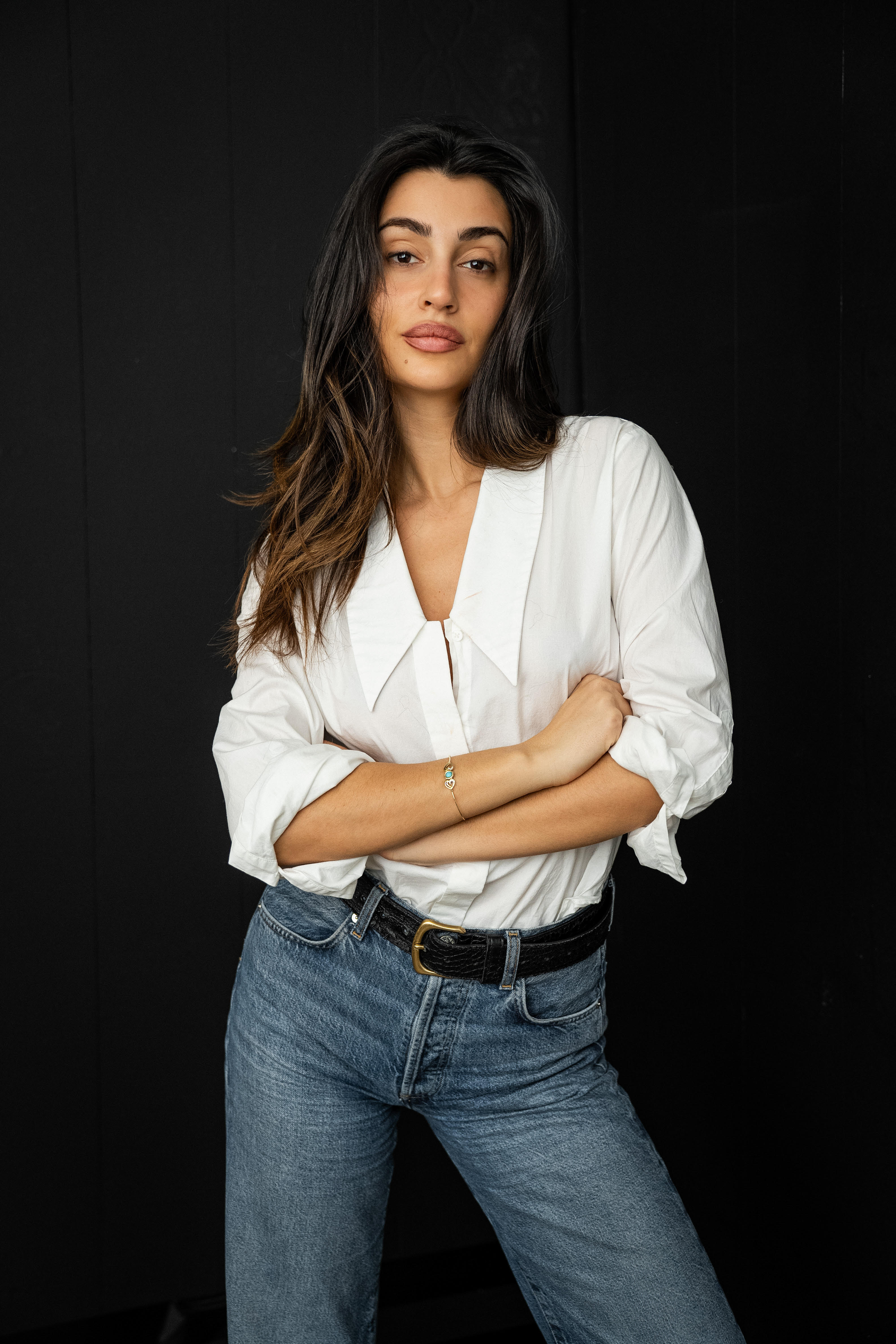
- Born: Athens, Greece
- Education: Athens University of Economics, Yale University

Sofia Harmanda (Greek: Σοφία Χαρμαντά) is a Greek model and actress.

== Early life and education ==
Sofia Harmanda was born in Athens, Greece. She pursued secondary education in Athens before attending the Athens University of Economics. She furthered her studies in digital marketing at Yale University.

Sofia is currently enrolled in the acting conservatory at the Lee Strasberg Theatre & Film Institute.

== Modeling career ==
Harmanda's modeling career began when she was discovered by a photographer in Athens. She worked in major European cities including Milan and London before moving to the United States in 2017.

Harmanda appeared on the cover of ELLE magazine three times, as well as on the covers of Madame Figaro and Marie Claire. She was the face of global campaigns for brands such as Yamamay, Le Meridien Hotels, Heidi Klum's lingerie brand, Laura Mercier, and L'Oréal.

In January 2024 Harmanda appeared on the cover of ELLE Greece, photographed by Thanassis Krikis, wearing Valentino, styled by Christos Alexandropoulos.

Harmanda has walked in many fashion shows and attended various high-profile events, including Gabrielle's Angel Foundation charity ball in New York City, Vanity Fair Oscar Party 2024, Vogue World 2024 in Paris and others.

=== Public activities ===
Sofia Harmanda serves as a global ambassador for Oxygen Seven, focusing on reforestation initiatives. She also supports KEPEA, an organization that aids individuals with special needs in Athens.

== Personal life ==
Sofia currently resides in New York. In addition to her modeling career, she is proficient in Latin and ballet dancing.
