= Superkiller complex protein 3 =

Protein found in humans

SKIC3

Identifiers
- Aliases: SKIC3, KIAA0372, Ski3, THES, tetratricopeptide repeat domain 37, TTC37, SKI3 subunit of superkiller complex
- External IDs: OMIM: 614589; MGI: 2679923; GeneCards: SKIC3

Gene location (Human)
| Chr. | Chromosome 5 (human) |
| Band | 5q15 | Start | 95,461,755 bp |
| Band | 5q15 | End | 95,554,977 bp |

Gene location (Mouse)
| Chr. | Chromosome 13 (mouse) |
| Band | 13|13 C1 | Start | 76,246,853 bp |
| Band | 13|13 C1 | End | 76,338,435 bp |
RNA expression pattern
| Bgee | Human / Mouse (ortholog); Top expressed in: Achilles tendon; stromal cell of endometrium; skin of thigh; right hemisphere of cerebellum; skin of hip; germinal epithelium; epithelium of colon; biceps brachii; body of pancreas; skin of abdomen / Top expressed in: zygote; secondary oocyte; hand; primary oocyte; cumulus cell; spermatid; otolith organ; utricle; lacrimal gland; internal carotid artery; More reference expression data |
| BioGPS | n/a |
Gene ontology
| Molecular function | protein binding |
| Cellular component | Ski complex; nucleoplasm; nucleus; cytoplasm; cytosol |
| Biological process | exonucleolytic catabolism of deadenylated mRNA; RNA catabolic process |
Sources:Amigo / QuickGO
Orthologs
| Databases | NCBI: entry; OMA: entry |
| Species | Human | Mouse |
| Entrez | 9652 | 218343 |
| Ensembl | ENSG00000198677 | ENSMUSG00000033991 |
| UniProt | Q6PGP7 | F8VPK0 |
| RefSeq (mRNA) | NM_014639 | NM_001081352 |
| RefSeq (protein) | NP_055454 | NP_001074821 |
| Location (UCSC) | Chr 5: 95.46 – 95.55 Mb | Chr 13: 76.25 – 76.34 Mb |
| PubMed search |
- Wikidata
| View/Edit Human | View/Edit Mouse |

Superkiller complex protein 3 (or Ski3) is a protein which in humans is encoded by gene SKIC3 (previously TTC37). As its name suggests, this protein is a component of the superkiller complex.

== Structure ==
The length of the polypeptide chain is 1,564 amino acids, and the molecular weight is 175,486 Da. SKIC3 contains six tetratricopeptide repeat domains, explaining its previous name "TTC37" (tetratricopeptide repeat domain 37).

== Function ==
SKIC3 is a component of the Ski complex which is involved in exosome mediated RNA decay.

== Subcellular distribution ==
It is localized in the cytoplasmatic space and the cell nucleus.

== Clinical significance ==
Mutation in the SKIC3 gene are associated with tricho-hepato-enteric syndrome.
