= Sophia Hadjipanteli =

Greek-Cypriot American model

- Born: May 25, 1997 (age 29); Maryland
- Occupation: Model
- Years active: 2017–present
- Modeling information
- Height: 5 ft 6 in (168 cm)
- Agency: Premier Model Management MUSE NYC

Sophia Hadjipanteli (Greek: Σοφία Χατζηπαντελή; born 25 May 1997) is a Greek Cypriot model, most notable for her unibrow look. She initially gained public attention in the UK in 2017 and first appeared in fashion shows during London's Fashion week 2020.

== Early life ==
Hadjipanteli was born on 25 May 1997 and was raised in Maryland, together with her brother. Hadjipanteli's first language is Greek as both her parents have Greek-Cypriot heritage, with her father was an accountant who was born in Cyprus. As a Cypriot refugee, he learned English, alongside his children as they grew up in the US. At age 14 she was discovered by Mario Testino. Her mother, born in London, is a photographer and it was one of her photos that got Hadjipanteli her first modelling position with Italian Vogue when she was 15 years old. She studied marketing at the University of Maryland where she started modeling for brands like Hugo Boss or Guess.

== Career ==
Hadjipanteli gained public attention as an Instagram model in 2017, and went on appear in shows in London Fashion Week in September 2019. As of 2021, Hadjipanteli was signed to Premier Model Management and MUSE NYC. She appeared in more than 50 publications worldwide, including, Vogue, Elle, Harper's Bazaar, New York Times and Vanity Fair. She has worked for fashion brands including Chanel, Jean Paul Gaultier and Fenty Beauty as well as done catwalk work.

She was on Greece's Next Top Model as a judge in 2023 and in 2024 also judged for the programme My Style Rocks.

== Unibrow and activism ==
Hadjipanteli is particularly noted for her unibrow look, and claims to have been inspired to have a unibrow by her family and culture. She has nicknamed her unique eyebrows "Veronica."

In response to public backlash about her looks, Hadjipanteli founded the #UnibrowMovement to promote unconventional beauty and embrace her heritage. She has accumulated more than 380,000 followers on Instagram and received death threats for her remarks and appearance. She has been outspoken in her support of "body-positive" female imagery.

== Personal life ==
As of 2019, Hadjipanteli was reported to be in a relationship with London-based photographer Zac Apostolou.
