= LEO1 =

Protein-coding gene in the species Homo sapiens

Identifiers
- Aliases: LEO1, RDL, LEO1 homolog, Paf1/RNA polymerase II complex component
- External IDs: OMIM: 610507; MGI: 2685031; GeneCards: LEO1
Available structures
PDB	Ortholog search: PDBe RCSB
PDB	List of PDB id codes 4M6T

Gene location (Human)
Chr.	Chromosome 15 (human)
Band	15q21.2	Start	51,938,025 bp
Band	15q21.2	End	51,971,778 bp

Gene location (Mouse)
Chr.	Chromosome 9 (mouse)
Band	9|9 D	Start	75,348,806 bp
Band	9|9 D	End	75,373,714 bp
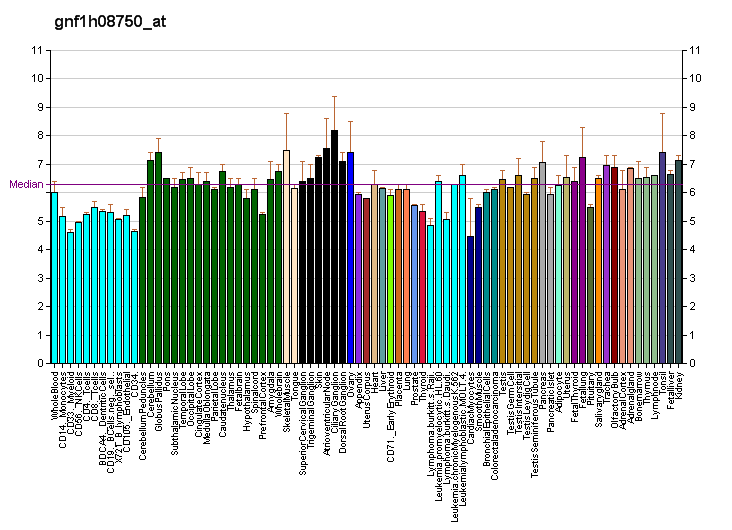

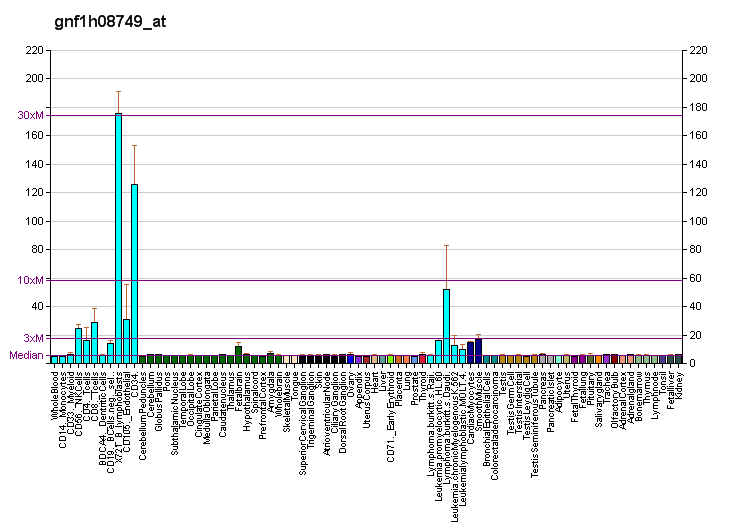
RNA expression pattern
Bgee	Human / Mouse (ortholog); Top expressed in: tendon of biceps brachii; ventricular zone; mucosa of transverse colon; ganglionic eminence; oocyte; rectum; islet of Langerhans; Achilles tendon; internal globus pallidus; secondary oocyte / Top expressed in: otic vesicle; tail of embryo; genital tubercle; neural layer of retina; zygote; morula; hand; blastocyst; embryo; ventricular zone; More reference expression data
BioGPS	More reference expression data
Gene ontology
Molecular function	RNA polymerase II C-terminal domain phosphoserine binding; protein binding
Cellular component	nucleus; centrosome; Cdc73/Paf1 complex; nucleoplasm; fibrillar center
Biological process	negative regulation of myeloid cell differentiation; positive regulation of mRNA 3'-end processing; mRNA polyadenylation; endodermal cell fate commitment; Wnt signaling pathway; histone H2B ubiquitination; stem cell population maintenance; regulation of transcription, DNA-templated; positive regulation of transcription by RNA polymerase II; transcription, DNA-templated; histone monoubiquitination; positive regulation of transcription elongation from RNA polymerase II promoter; histone modification; beta-catenin-TCF complex assembly; transcription by RNA polymerase II; transcription elongation from RNA polymerase II promoter; protein ubiquitination
Sources:Amigo / QuickGO
Orthologs
Databases	NCBI: entry; OMA: entry
Species	Human	Mouse
Entrez	123169	235497
Ensembl	ENSG00000166477	ENSMUSG00000042487
UniProt	Q8WVC0	Q5XJE5
RefSeq (mRNA)	NM_001286430; NM_138792; NM_001323903; NM_001323904	NM_001006122; NM_001039522
RefSeq (protein)	NP_001273359; NP_001310832; NP_001310833; NP_620147	NP_001034611
Location (UCSC)	Chr 15: 51.94 – 51.97 Mb	Chr 9: 75.35 – 75.37 Mb
PubMed search
- Wikidata
View/Edit Human	View/Edit Mouse

RNA polymerase-associated protein LEO1 is an enzyme that in humans is encoded by the LEO1 gene. This protein is part of the PAF1 complex.
