= WAC (gene) =

Protein-coding gene in humans

Identifiers
- Aliases: WAC, BM-016, PRO1741, Wwp4, DESSH, WW domain containing adaptor with coiled-coil
- External IDs: OMIM: 615049; MGI: 2387357; HomoloGene: 41148; GeneCards: WAC; OMA:WAC - orthologs

Gene location (Human)
| Chr. | Chromosome 10 (human) |
| Band | 10p12.1|10p12.1-p11.2 | Start | 28,532,493 bp |
| Band | 10p12.1|10p12.1-p11.2 | End | 28,623,112 bp |

Gene location (Mouse)
| Chr. | Chromosome 18 (mouse) |
| Band | 18|18 A1 | Start | 7,868,832 bp |
| Band | 18|18 A1 | End | 7,929,028 bp |
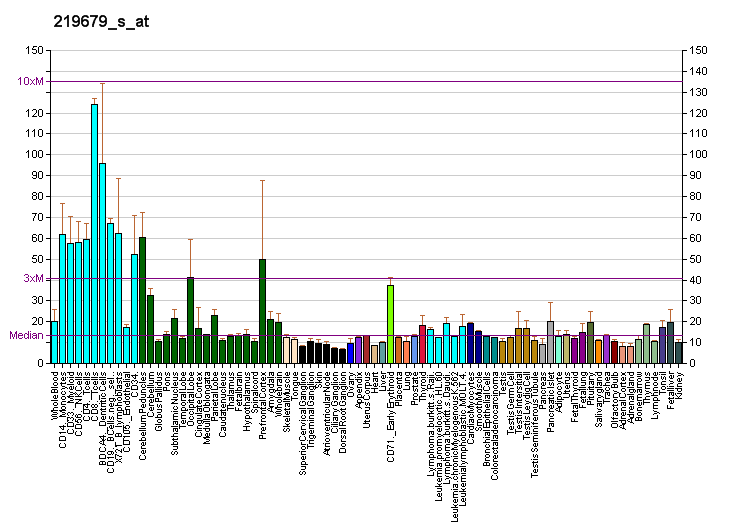

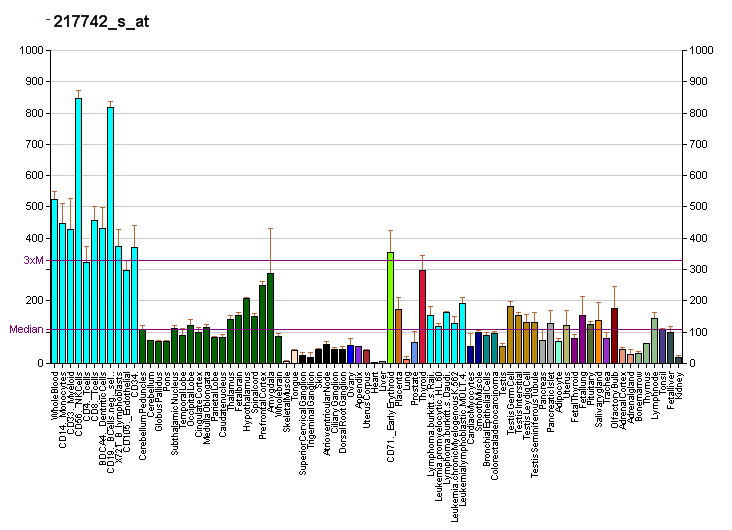
RNA expression pattern
| Bgee | Human / Mouse (ortholog); Top expressed in: endothelial cell; secondary oocyte; Brodmann area 23; germinal epithelium; caput epididymis; tail of epididymis; corpus epididymis; parietal pleura; superficial temporal artery; amniotic fluid / Top expressed in: genital tubercle; tail of embryo; human fetus; lateral septal nucleus; ventromedial nucleus; neural layer of retina; body of femur; ciliary body; medullary collecting duct; mammillary body; More reference expression data |
| BioGPS | More reference expression data |
Gene ontology
| Molecular function | RNA polymerase II complex binding; chromatin binding; protein binding |
| Cellular component | nuclear speck; spliceosomal complex; nucleus; nucleoplasm |
| Biological process | positive regulation of transcription, DNA-templated; histone monoubiquitination; positive regulation of macroautophagy; regulation of transcription, DNA-templated; histone H2B conserved C-terminal lysine ubiquitination; transcription, DNA-templated; cellular response to DNA damage stimulus; negative regulation of proteasomal ubiquitin-dependent protein catabolic process; protein ubiquitination; chromatin organization |
Sources:Amigo / QuickGO
Orthologs
| Species | Human | Mouse |
| Entrez | 51322 | 225131 |
| Ensembl | ENSG00000095787 | ENSMUSG00000024283 |
| UniProt | Q9BTA9 | Q924H7 |
| RefSeq (mRNA) | NM_016628; NM_100264; NM_100486 | NM_001146298; NM_001282093; NM_153085; NM_001360956 |
| RefSeq (protein) | NP_057712; NP_567822; NP_567823 | NP_001139770; NP_001269022; NP_694725; NP_001347885 |
| Location (UCSC) | Chr 10: 28.53 – 28.62 Mb | Chr 18: 7.87 – 7.93 Mb |
| PubMed search |
- Wikidata
| View/Edit Human | View/Edit Mouse |

WW domain-containing adapter protein with coiled-coil is a protein that in humans is encoded by the WAC gene.

The protein encoded by this gene contains a WW domain, which is a protein module found in a wide range of signaling proteins. This domain mediates protein-protein interactions and binds proteins containing short linear peptide motifs that are proline-rich or contain at least one proline. This gene product shares 94% sequence identity with the WAC protein in mouse, however, its exact function is not known.
