= CTR9 =

Protein-coding gene in the species Homo sapiens

Identifiers
- Aliases: CTR9, SH2BP1, TSBP, p150, p150TSP, CTR9 homolog, Paf1/RNA polymerase II complex component
- External IDs: OMIM: 609366; MGI: 109345; GeneCards: CTR9

Gene location (Human)
Chr.	Chromosome 11 (human)
Band	11p15.4	Start	10,751,246 bp
Band	11p15.4	End	10,801,625 bp

Gene location (Mouse)
Chr.	Chromosome 7 (mouse)
Band	7 E3|7 57.98 cM	Start	110,628,158 bp
Band	7 E3|7 57.98 cM	End	110,655,584 bp
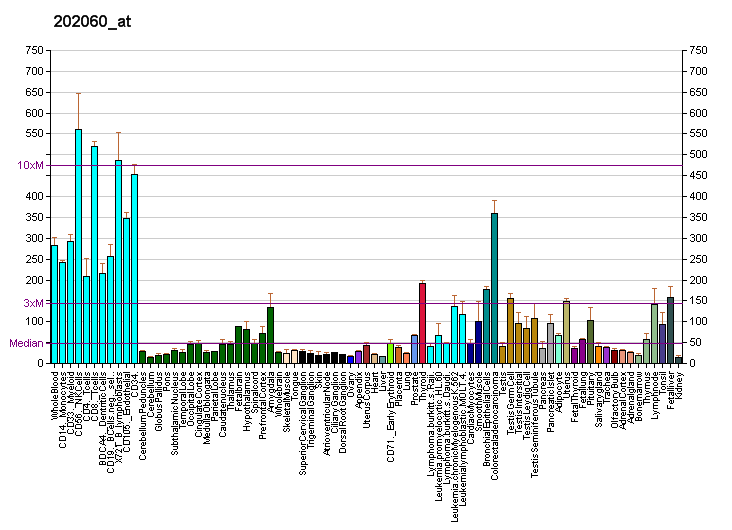
RNA expression pattern
Bgee	Human / Mouse (ortholog); Top expressed in: corpus epididymis; epithelium of nasopharynx; palpebral conjunctiva; bronchial epithelial cell; germinal epithelium; retinal pigment epithelium; caput epididymis; oral cavity; jejunal mucosa; tail of epididymis / Top expressed in: Rostral migratory stream; neural layer of retina; spermatocyte; transitional epithelium of urinary bladder; tail of embryo; gastrula; uterus; spermatid; genital tubercle; epiblast; More reference expression data
BioGPS	More reference expression data
Gene ontology
Molecular function	RNA polymerase II complex binding; SH2 domain binding; protein binding
Cellular component	nuclear speck; nucleus; nucleoplasm; Cdc73/Paf1 complex
Biological process	histone monoubiquitination; receptor signaling pathway via JAK-STAT; negative regulation of mRNA polyadenylation; regulation of transcription, DNA-templated; histone H3-K4 trimethylation; negative regulation of transcription by RNA polymerase II; Wnt signaling pathway; transcription, DNA-templated; stem cell population maintenance; interleukin-6-mediated signaling pathway; endodermal cell fate commitment; positive regulation of histone H3-K4 methylation; inner cell mass cell differentiation; trophectodermal cell differentiation; positive regulation of histone H3-K79 methylation; blastocyst growth; histone H2B ubiquitination; positive regulation of histone H2B ubiquitination; cellular response to lipopolysaccharide; negative regulation of myeloid cell differentiation; regulation of genetic imprinting; positive regulation of transcription elongation from RNA polymerase II promoter; positive regulation of transcription by RNA polymerase II; transcription by RNA polymerase II; transcription elongation from RNA polymerase II promoter; protein ubiquitination; histone modification; regulation of histone H3-K4 methylation; blastocyst hatching
Sources:Amigo / QuickGO
Orthologs
Databases	NCBI: entry; OMA: entry
Species	Human	Mouse
Entrez	9646	22083
Ensembl	ENSG00000198730	ENSMUSG00000005609
UniProt	Q6PD62	Q62018
RefSeq (mRNA)	NM_014633; NM_001346279	NM_009431
RefSeq (protein)	NP_001333208; NP_055448	NP_033457
Location (UCSC)	Chr 11: 10.75 – 10.8 Mb	Chr 7: 110.63 – 110.66 Mb
PubMed search
- Wikidata
View/Edit Human	View/Edit Mouse

RNA polymerase-associated protein CTR9 homolog is an enzyme that in humans is encoded by the CTR9 gene. This protein is a component of the PAF1 complex, which is involved in regulating DNA to RNA transcription by RNA polymerase II.
