= Ribonuclease =

Class of enzyme that catalyzes the degradation of RNA

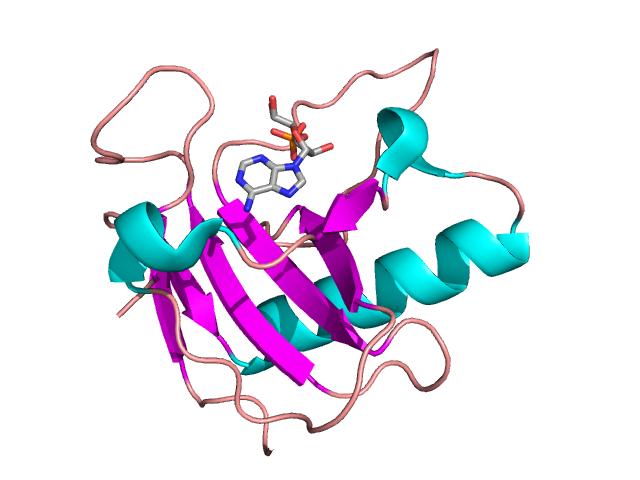
- Ustilago sphaerogena Ribonuclease U2 with AMP PDB entry 3agn

Identifiers
- Symbol: Ribonuclease
- Pfam: PF00545
- InterPro: IPR000026
- SCOP2: 1brn / SCOPe / SUPFAM
Available protein structures:
- PDB: 1mgwA:56-137 1mgrA:56-137 1uckB:11-92 1i70A:11-92 2sarA:11-92 1ucjB:11-92 1lniB:11-92 1ay7A:11-92 1t2hB:11-92 1boxA:11-92 1uclA:11-92 1rgeB:11-92 1t2iA:11-92 1c54A:11-92 1rsnB:11-92 1gmqA:11-92 1uciA:11-92 1sarB:11-92 1gmpA:11-92 1rgfA:11-92 1rggB:11-92 1rghB:11-92 1i8vB:11-92 1gmrB:11-92 1ynvX:11-92 1py3B:79-159 1pylA:79-159 2rbiB:72-161 1goyA:72-161 1gouB:72-161 1govA:72-161 1bujA:72-161 1baoB:67-156 1bsdA:67-156 1banB:67-156 1brhA:67-156 1brgC:67-156 1brkC:67-156 1bnsA:67-156 1bnfB:67-156 1bgsB:67-156 1bnjB:67-156 1bsaB:67-156 1bsbC:67-156 1b3sB:67-156 1x1wB:67-156 1bniB:67-156 1b2xB:67-156 1b2zA:67-156 1bscC:67-156 1bseB:67-156 1x1yB:67-156 1briC:67-156 1b2uC:67-156 1b27C:67-156 1b20B:67-156 1bnr :67-156 1b2sC:67-156 1yvs :67-156 1brsC:67-156 1brjC:67-156 1bneA:67-156 1bngC:67-156 1a2pA:67-156 1x1uB:67-156 1fw7A:67-156 1rnbA:67-156 1b21C:67-156 1x1xB:67-156 1brnM:67-156 1b2mA:46-129 1i0vA:46-129 1rls :46-129 1fysA:46-129 1bviB:46-129 1i2eA:46-129 2hohD:46-129 3rnt :46-129 6gsp :46-129 4gsp :46-129 1lowA:46-129 1i0xA:46-129 1birB:46-129 1trqA:46-129 1det :46-129 1i2gA:46-129 3bu4A:46-129 1rn1A:46-129 1rnt :46-129 4hohD:46-129 1rga :46-129 4bu4A:46-129 1rhlA:46-129 5bu4A:46-129 1hz1A:46-129 1trpA:46-129 5hohA:46-129 7gspA:46-129 1ygw :46-129 1gsp :46-129 1bu4 :46-129 6rnt :46-129 1ch0B:46-129 1rgcB:46-129 4bir :46-129 2rnt :46-129 3hohD:46-129 1rgl :46-129 1rn4 :46-129 1fzuA:46-129 1lovA:46-129 5gsp :46-129 9rnt :46-129 3bir :46-129 1q9eC:46-129 1i3fA:46-129 5birA:46-129 1g02A:46-129 1loyA:46-129 2birA:46-129 1ttoA:46-129 2aadB:46-129 1lra :46-129 1i3iA:46-129 2bu4A:46-129 2gsp :46-129 1hyfA:46-129 3gsp :46-129 1iyyA:46-129 7rnt :46-129 2aae :46-129 8rnt :46-129 5rnt :46-129 1i2fA:46-129 4rnt :46-129 1rgk :46-129 1rms :21-102 1rds :21-102 1fut :45-127 1rcl :45-127 1fus :45-127 1rck :45-127 1rtu :23-113 1aqzA:82-174 1jbrB:82-174 1jbtA:82-174 1jbsA:82-174 1de3A:83-175 1r4yA:83-175 IPR000026 PF00545 (ECOD; PDBsum)
- AlphaFold: IPR000026; PF00545

Ribonuclease (commonly abbreviated RNase) is a type of nuclease that catalyzes the degradation of RNA into smaller components. Ribonucleases can be divided into endoribonucleases and exoribonucleases, and comprise several sub-classes within the EC 2.7 (for the phosphorolytic enzymes) and 3.1 (for the hydrolytic enzymes) classes of enzymes.

== Function ==
Ribonucleases are found in all domains of life as well as in viruses. While some families of RNases, such as EndoU-like RNases, are ubiquitous, others, such as RNase A, are only found in a subset of vertebrates. RNases play a role in a multitude of processes including antiviral defense, mRNA regulation, RNA maturation of coding and noncoding RNA, RNA interference and replication in retroviruses.

Some cells also secrete copious quantities of non-specific RNases such as A and T1. RNases are, therefore, extremely common, resulting in very short lifespans for any RNA that is not in a protected environment. All intracellular RNAs are protected from RNase activity by a number of strategies including 5' end capping, 3' end polyadenylation, formation of an RNA·RNA duplex, and folding within an RNA protein complex (ribonucleoprotein particle or RNP).

Another mechanism of protection is ribonuclease inhibitor (RI), which binds to certain ribonucleases with the highest affinity of any protein-protein interaction; the dissociation constant for the RI-RNase A complex is between 10^{−14} and 10^{−16} M under physiological conditions. Recombinant RNase inhibitors (RRIs), which are in-vitro synthesized RI, are used in most laboratories that study RNA to protect their samples against degradation from environmental RNases.

Similar to restriction enzymes, which cleave highly specific sequences of double-stranded DNA, a variety of endoribonucleases that recognize and cleave specific sequences of single-stranded RNA have been recently classified.

RNases play a critical role in many biological processes, including angiogenesis and self-incompatibility in flowering plants (angiosperms). Many stress-response toxins of prokaryotic toxin-antitoxin systems have been shown to have RNase activity and homology.

== Classification ==
=== Major types of endoribonucleases ===
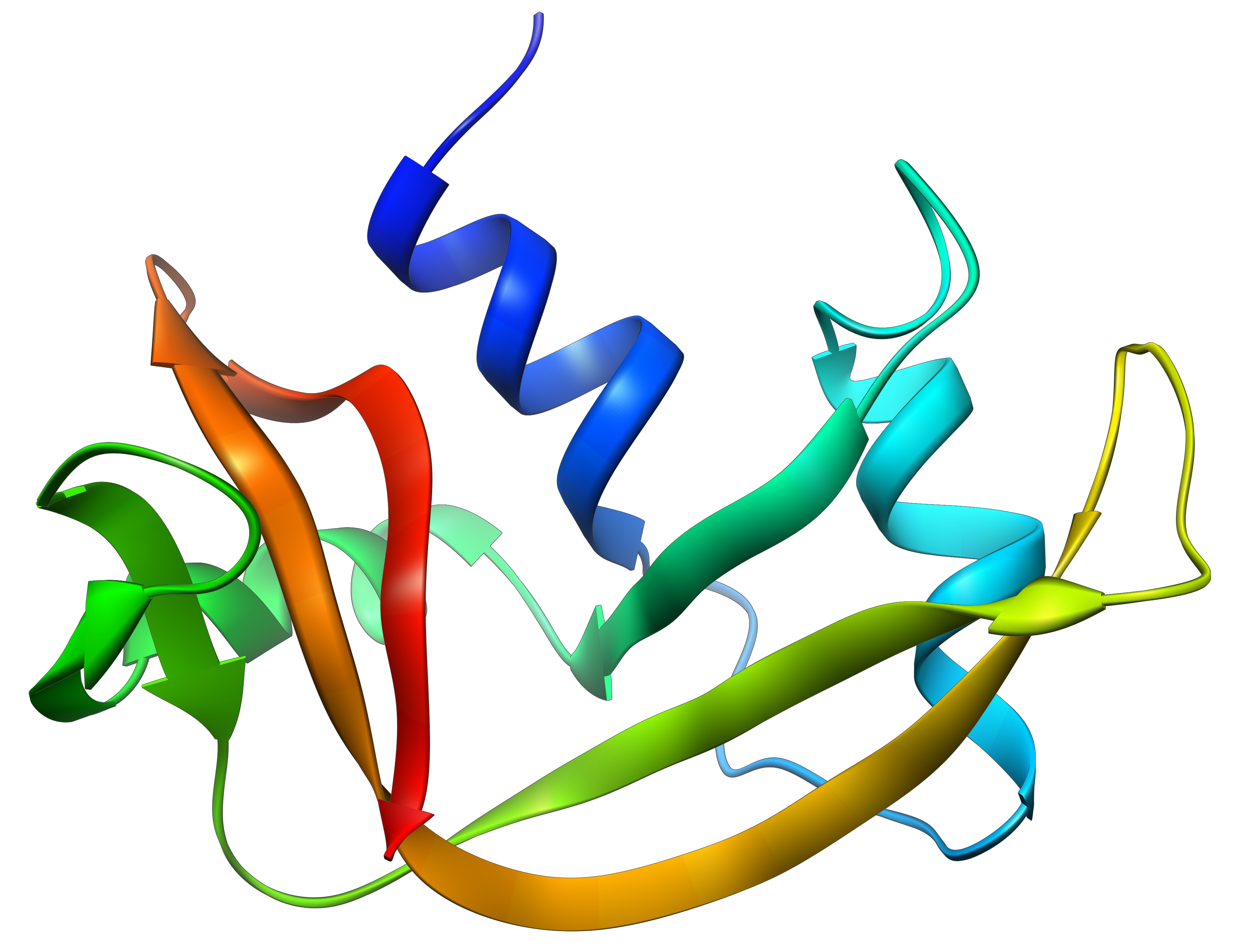
Structure of RNase A

- EC 4.6.1.18: RNase A is an RNase that is commonly used in research. RNase A (e.g., bovine pancreatic ribonuclease A: PDB: 2AAS) is one of the hardiest enzymes in common laboratory usage; one method of isolating it is to boil a crude cellular extract until all enzymes other than RNase A are denatured. It is specific for single-stranded RNAs. It cleaves the 3'-end of unpaired C and U residues, ultimately forming a 3'-phosphorylated product via a 2',3'-cyclic monophosphate intermediate. It does not require any cofactors for its activity.
- EC 3.1.26.4: RNase H is a ribonuclease that cleaves the RNA in a DNA/RNA duplex to produce ssDNA. RNase H is a non-specific endonuclease and catalyzes the cleavage of RNA via a hydrolytic mechanism, aided by an enzyme-bound divalent metal ion. RNase H leaves a 5'-phosphorylated product.
- EC 3.1.26.3: RNase III is a type of ribonuclease that cleaves rRNA (16S rRNA and 23S rRNA) from transcribed polycistronic RNA operon in prokaryotes. It also digests double-stranded RNA (dsRNA)-Dicer family of RNAse, cutting pre-miRNA (60–70bp long) at a specific site and transforming it in miRNA (22–30bp), that is actively involved in the regulation of transcription and mRNA life-time.
- EC number 3.1.26.-??: RNase L is an interferon-induced nuclease that, upon activation, destroys all RNA within the cell
- EC 3.1.26.5: RNase P is a type of ribonuclease that is unique in that it is a ribozyme – a ribonucleic acid that acts as a catalyst in the same way as an enzyme. One of its functions is to cleave off a leader sequence from the 5' end of one stranded pre-tRNA. RNase P is one of two known multiple turnover ribozymes in nature (the other being the ribosome). In bacteria RNase P is also responsible for the catalytic activity of holoenzymes, which consist of an apoenzyme that forms an active enzyme system by combination with a coenzyme and determines the specificity of this system for a substrate. A form of RNase P that is a protein and does not contain RNA has recently been discovered.
- EC number 3.1.??: RNase PhyM is sequence specific for single-stranded RNAs. It cleaves 3'-end of unpaired A and U residues.
- EC 4.6.1.24: RNase T1 is sequence specific for single-stranded RNAs. It cleaves 3'-end of unpaired G residues.
- EC 4.6.1.19: RNase T2 is sequence specific for single-stranded RNAs. It cleaves 3'-end of all 4 residues, but preferentially 3'-end of As.
- EC 4.6.1.20: RNase U2 is sequence specific for single-stranded RNAs. It cleaves 3'-end of unpaired A residues.
- EC 3.1.27.8: RNase V is specific for polyadenine and polyuridine RNA.
- EC 3.1.26.12: RNase E is a ribonuclease of plant origin, which modulates SOS responses in bacteria, for a response to the stress of DNA damage by activation of the SOS mechanism by the RecA/LexA dependent signal transduction pathway that transcriptionally depresses a multiplicity of genes leading to transit arrest of cell division as well as initiation of DNA repair.
- EC 3.1.26.-: RNase G It is involved in processing the 16'-end of the 5s rRNA. It is related to chromosome separation and cell division. It is considered one of the components of cytoplasmic axial filament bundles. It is also thought that it can regulate the formation of this structure.

=== Major types of exoribonucleases ===
- EC number EC 2.7.7.8: Polynucleotide Phosphorylase (PNPase) functions as an exonuclease as well as a nucleotidyltransferase.
- EC number EC 2.7.7.56: RNase PH functions as an exonuclease as well as a nucleotidyltransferase.
- EC number 3.1.??: RNase R is a close homolog of RNase II, but it can, unlike RNase II, degrade RNA with secondary structures without help of accessory factors.
- EC number EC 3.1.13.5: RNase D is involved in the 3'-to-5' processing of pre-tRNAs.
- EC number 3.1.??: RNase T is the major contributor for the 3'-to-5' maturation of many stable RNAs.
- EC 3.1.13.3: Oligoribonuclease degrades short oligonucleotides to mononucleotides.
- EC 3.1.11.1: Exoribonuclease I degrades single-stranded RNA from 5'-to-3', exists only in eukaryotes.
- EC 3.1.13.1: Exoribonuclease II is a close homolog of Exoribonuclease I.

== RNase specificity ==
The active site looks like a rift valley where all the active site residues create the wall and bottom of the valley. The rift is very thin and the small substrate fits perfectly in the middle of the active site, which allows for perfect interaction with the residues. It actually has a little curvature to the site which the substrate also has. Although usually most exo- and endoribonucleases are not sequence specific, recently CRISPR/Cas system natively recognizing and cutting DNA was engineered to cleave ssRNA in a sequence-specific manner.

== RNase contamination during RNA extraction ==
The extraction of RNA in molecular biology experiments is greatly complicated by the presence of ubiquitous and hardy ribonucleases that degrade RNA samples. Certain RNases can be extremely hardy and inactivating them is difficult compared to neutralizing DNases. In addition to the cellular RNases that are released, there are several RNases that are present in the environment. RNases have evolved to have many extracellular functions in various organisms. For example, RNase 7, a member of the RNase A superfamily, is secreted by human skin and serves as a potent antipathogen defence. In these secreted RNases, the enzymatic RNase activity may not even be necessary for its new, exapted function. For example, immune RNases act by destabilizing the cell membranes of bacteria.

== Sources ==
- D'Alessio G and Riordan JF, eds. (1997) Ribonucleases: Structures and Functions, Academic Press.
- Gerdes K, Christensen SK and Lobner-Olesen A (2005). "Prokaryotic toxin-antitoxin stress response loci". Nat. Rev. Microbiol. (3) 371–382.
