= Flavivirus 3' UTR =

Flavivirus 3' UTR are untranslated regions in the genome of viruses in the genus Flavivirus.

== Background ==
The Flavivirus positive-oriented, single-stranded RNA genome has a length of 10,000 - 11,000 bases. The genus includes human pathogens like Zika virus, West-Nile virus, Dengue virus, Yellow Fever virus and other.

The 3' UTR ranges between 400 and 700 nucleotides in length. Its RNA secondary structure is known to be necessary for the viral replication during infection. In contrast to the structurally conserved 5' UTR of flaviviruses, individual structural elements differ between different viruses, which is associated with the host-adaptation. Flaviviruses are therefore classified into four different groups: Mosquito-borne flaviviruses (MBFV), tick-borne flaviviruses (TBFV), insect-specific flaviviruses (ISFV) and those with no known vector (NKV).

Across all groups, three RNA secondary structure elements are conserved within the 3' UTR: the dumbbell element (DB), cis-acting replication element (CRE) and the exoribonuclease-resistant RNA elements (xrRNA). Further, unique elements have been observed for specific groups as well.

== Subgenomic flavivirus RNA ==
The 3' UTR of flavivirus - and sometimes even a small part of the 3' end of the coding region - is also called subgenomic flavivirus RNA (sfRNA). It has been shown that sfRNA is implied in many different pathways that comprises both, host defenses and viral infection. SfRNA is produced by incomplete degradation of the viral genome by the host cell (via XRN1). Local RNA secondary structures (xrRNA elements) in the 3' UTR and long-range RNA-RNA interactions between 5' UTR and 3' UTR of flaviviruses stall XRN1 and causes the undigested fragment of the genome.

== xrRNA element ==
The exoribonuclease-resistant RNA elements (xrRNA) are described throughout all groups of flaviviruses. Usually, each virus harbors two xrRNAs, xrRNA1 and xrRNA2, in the beginning of the 3' UTR. The formation of these stem-loops, especially xrRNA1, is vital to ensure resistance against XRN1 activity. The Y-shaped stem-loop is also termed SL II and SL IV, respectively. In order to function as xrRNA, the sequence downstream is needed as well, since the upper loop region forms a pseudoknot (PK) with the single-stranded region directly downstream to its respective hairpin. In some species, the region downstream also forms a small hairpin. In such cases, the PK interactions takes place between the two loop regions. Conserved formation of these structures were observed in mammalian cells but not in mosquito cells, suggesting this region has varying functions in different hosts. In plant-viruses, xrRNA elements have been observed as well, showing some similarities to flaviviral xrRNAs. However, plant-virus xrRNA and flaviviral xrRNA are distinguishable by their underlying three-dimensional folds. It has been reported that xrRNAs block the progression of 5' to 3' exoribonuclease producing subgenomic RNAs. xrRNA elements can be found in some of the deadliest viruses in agriculture including, potato leafroll virus (PLRV), leading responsible virus for worldwide potato yield loss, maize chlorotic mottle virus (MCMV), responsible for 90% maize/corn yield loss in sub-Saharan Africa, and maize yellow dwarf virus-RMV (MYDV- RMV), formerly BYDV-RMV.

== Dumbbell element ==
The dumbbell element (DB) are important for viral RNA synthesis. Via the formation of additional pseudoknots, the loop regions of DB pairs with a complementary motif further downstream of the respective DB element. The DB elements also expose conserved sequences (CS) and repeated conserved sequences (RCS). Further, the DB elements are also playing a role in viral translation, as deletion of both elements reduced viral translation levels.

== Pseudoknot-forming stem-loops ==
There is evidence that pseudoknot-forming stem-loops (SL-PK) are encoded by dual-host insect-specific flaviviruses and classical insect-specific flaviviruses but while short stem-loops are present in the genomes of all mosquito-borne flaviviruses, they are not involved in pseudoknot interactions for which structural is available. It is thought that SL-PK might stabilise xrRNAs or confer additional XRN1 resistance as abolishing the SL-PK of various viruses reduces the production of sfRNAs.

== CRE structure ==
The cis-acting replication element (CRE) structure is structurally conserved among known flaviviruses. It consists of a small hairpin (sHP) and a larger structural element (3'SL). Mutations of sHP are shown to be lethal for Dengue virus in mosquito cells. CRE is highly involved in the 5'-3' UTR interaction of flaviviruses. Regions of sHP are interacting with the SLB element and the cHP in the 5' UTR, whereas the 3'SL harbors a sequence that can interact with SLB, to further stabilize this long-range RNA-RNA interaction.

== Repeated elements ==
In ISFV, structural alignments of the 3' UTR revealed that many species harbor three to four repeats of two highly conserved elements, termed Ra and Rb. These elements show variable loop regions and low sequence conservation in the Ra element. However, strong structure conservation and the occurrence of multiple copies may hint towards a possible functional importance of these elements.

== SL6 short hairpin ==
In different studies, a short stem-loop, named SL6 has been observed in at least TBEV, LGTV and OHFV. SL6 shows a high heterogeneity among different tick-borne flaviviruses, but is structurally conserved supported by multiple covariation.
