= Exoribonuclease-resistant RNA =

Exoribonuclease-resistant RNAs (xrRNAs) are structured viral RNA elements that block 5′→3′ degradation by host exoribonucleases such as Xrn1. This resistance leads to the accumulation of stable subgenomic RNA fragments that play key roles in viral replication and pathogenicity. First identified in the flavivirus West Nile virus (WNV), xrRNAs are now known across diverse RNA viruses infecting vertebrates, insects, and plants.

== xrRNAs in the Flaviviridae family ==
xrRNAs are present across all genera of the Flaviviridae, including mosquito, tick-borne, and no-known vector flaviviruses, as well as pegiviruses, hepaciviruses and pestiviruses. Most flaviviruses contain two xrRNAs (xrRNA1 and xrRNA2) near the start of the 3′ untranslated region (UTR), also referred to as SL II and SL IV. Each xrRNA folds into a double pseudoknot (PK) centered around a three-way junction (3WJ), forming a protective ring structure around the 5’ end that physically blocks 5′→3′ exonuclease progression Many xrRNAs contain an additional short stem-loop (SL) downstream of the second PK, which is nonessential for resistance. Based on structural differences, flavivirus xrRNAs are classified into subclasses 1a, 1b, and 2. The subgenomic RNAs (called sfRNA1 and sfRNA2) derived from exoribonuclease stalling in front of xrRNA1 and xrRNA2, respectively, contribute to immune evasion and viral pathogenicity in both mammalian and insect hosts, although their precise molecular mechanisms remain incompletely understood.
