= Ribonuclease V1 =

Ribonuclease enzyme found in the venom of the Caspian cobra

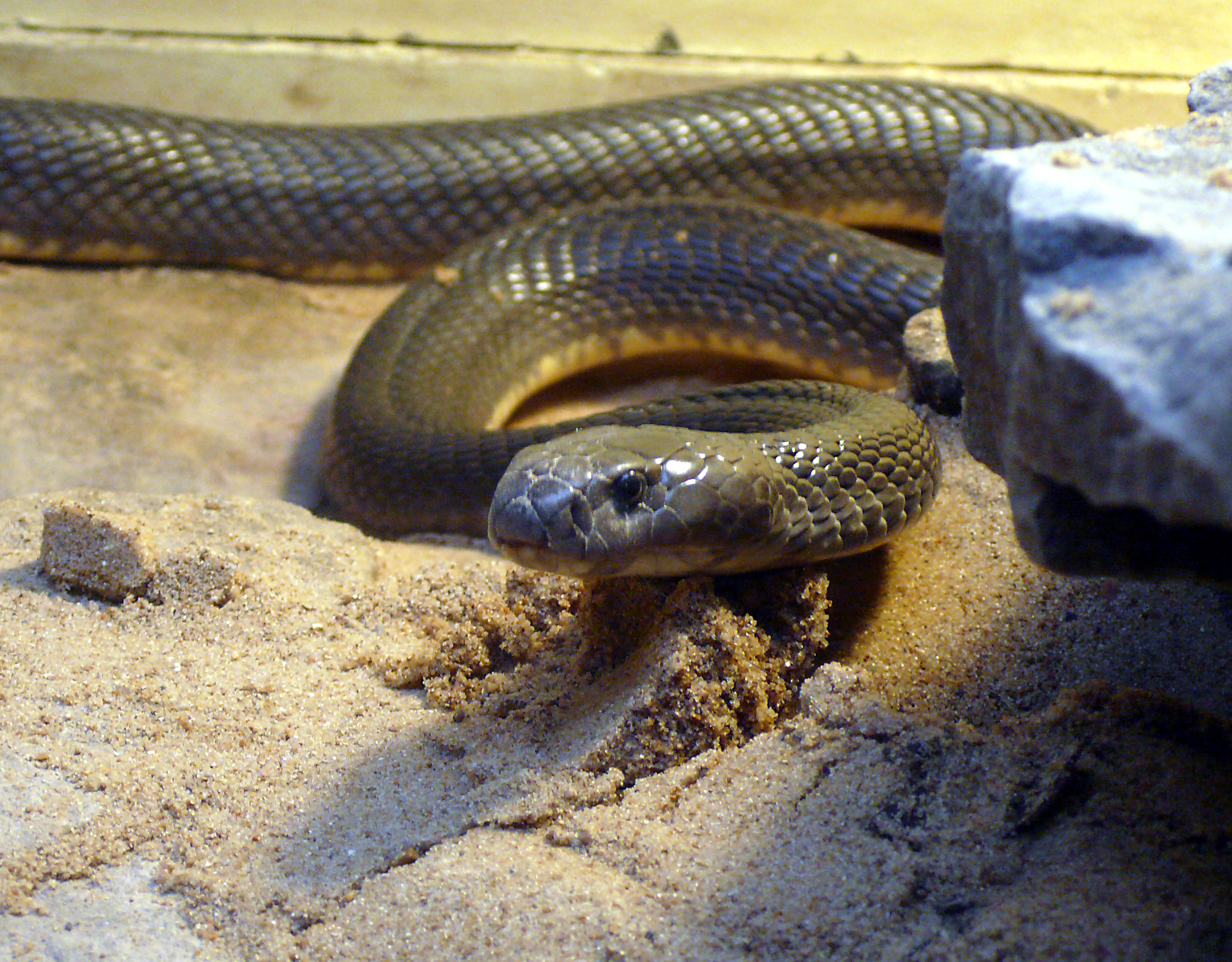
A Caspian cobra

Ribonuclease V1 (RNase V1) is a ribonuclease enzyme found in the venom of the Caspian cobra (Naja oxiana). It cleaves double-stranded RNA in a non-sequence-specific manner, usually requiring a substrate of at least six stacked nucleotides. Like many ribonucleases, the enzyme requires the presence of magnesium ions for activity.

== Laboratory use ==
Purified RNase V1 is a commonly used reagent in molecular biology experiments. In conjunction with other ribonucleases that cleave single-stranded RNA after specific nucleotides or sequences – such as RNase T1 and RNase I – it can be used to map internal interactions in large RNA molecules with complex secondary structure or to perform footprinting experiments on macromolecular complexes containing RNA.

RNase V1 is the only commonly used laboratory RNase that provides positive evidence for the presence of double-stranded helical conformations in target RNA. Because RNase V1 has some activity against RNA that is base-paired but single-stranded, dual susceptibility to both RNase V1 and RNase I at a single site in a target RNA molecule provides evidence of this relatively unusual conformation found in RNA loops.

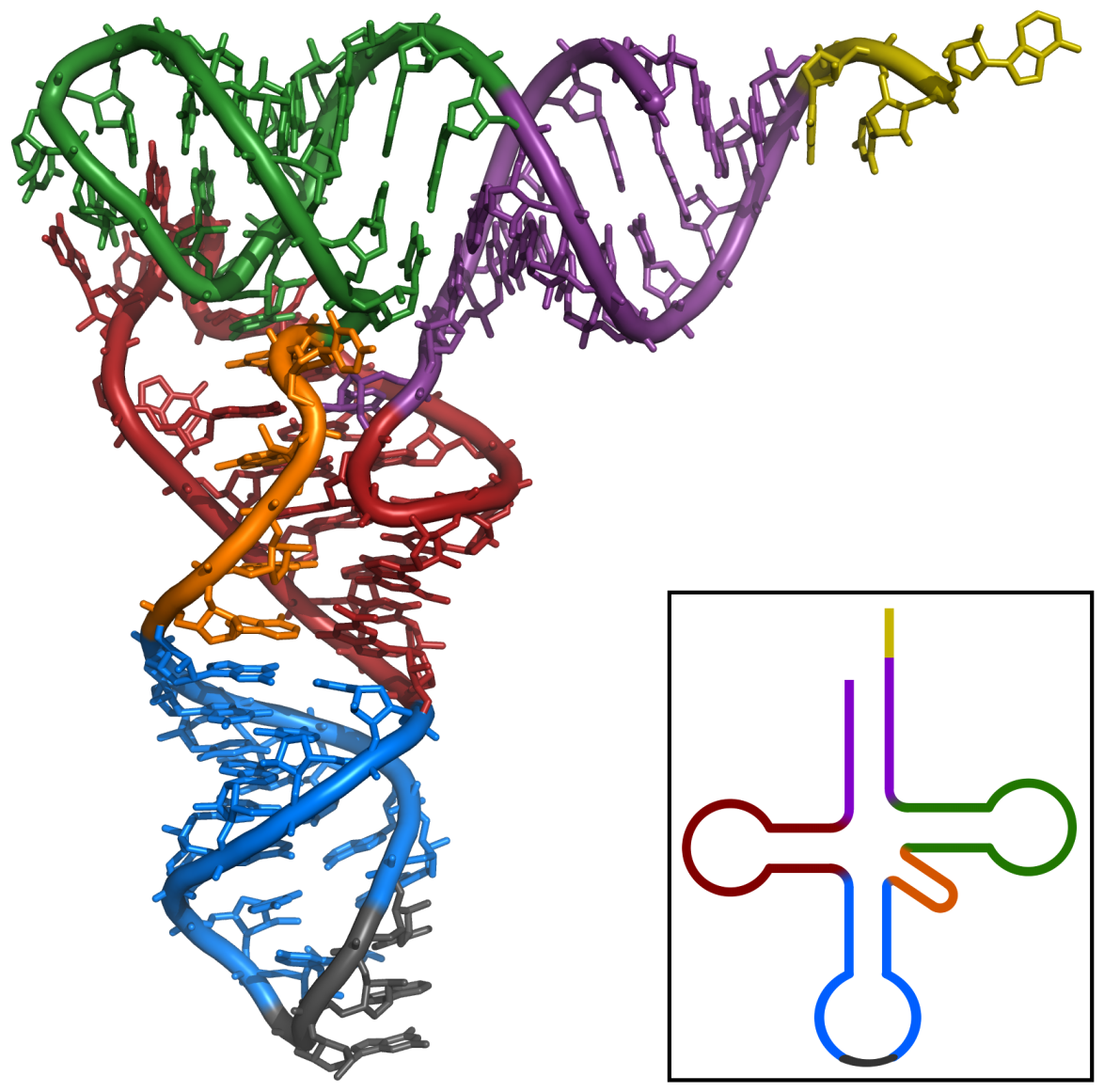
The distinctive secondary structure of transfer RNA, containing a series of double helices separated by flexible loops

== Structural discoveries ==
RNase V1 played a particularly important role in the elucidation of the distinctive stem-loop structure of transfer RNA. It has also been extensively used to study the highly structured RNA genomes of retroviruses, such as hepatitis C, dengue virus, and HIV. Together with S1 nuclease, which specifically cleaves single-stranded RNA, it can be used to profile the secondary structure propensities of messenger RNA molecules, a procedure that can be applied to whole transcriptomes when paired with deep sequencing.
