= Ribonucleate nucleotido-2'-transferase (cyclizing) =

Ribonucleate nucleotido-2'-transferase (cyclizing) may refer to:

- Ribonuclease T2, an enzyme
- Bacillus subtilis ribonuclease, an enzyme
