= Plant virus xrRNAs =

PV xrRNA
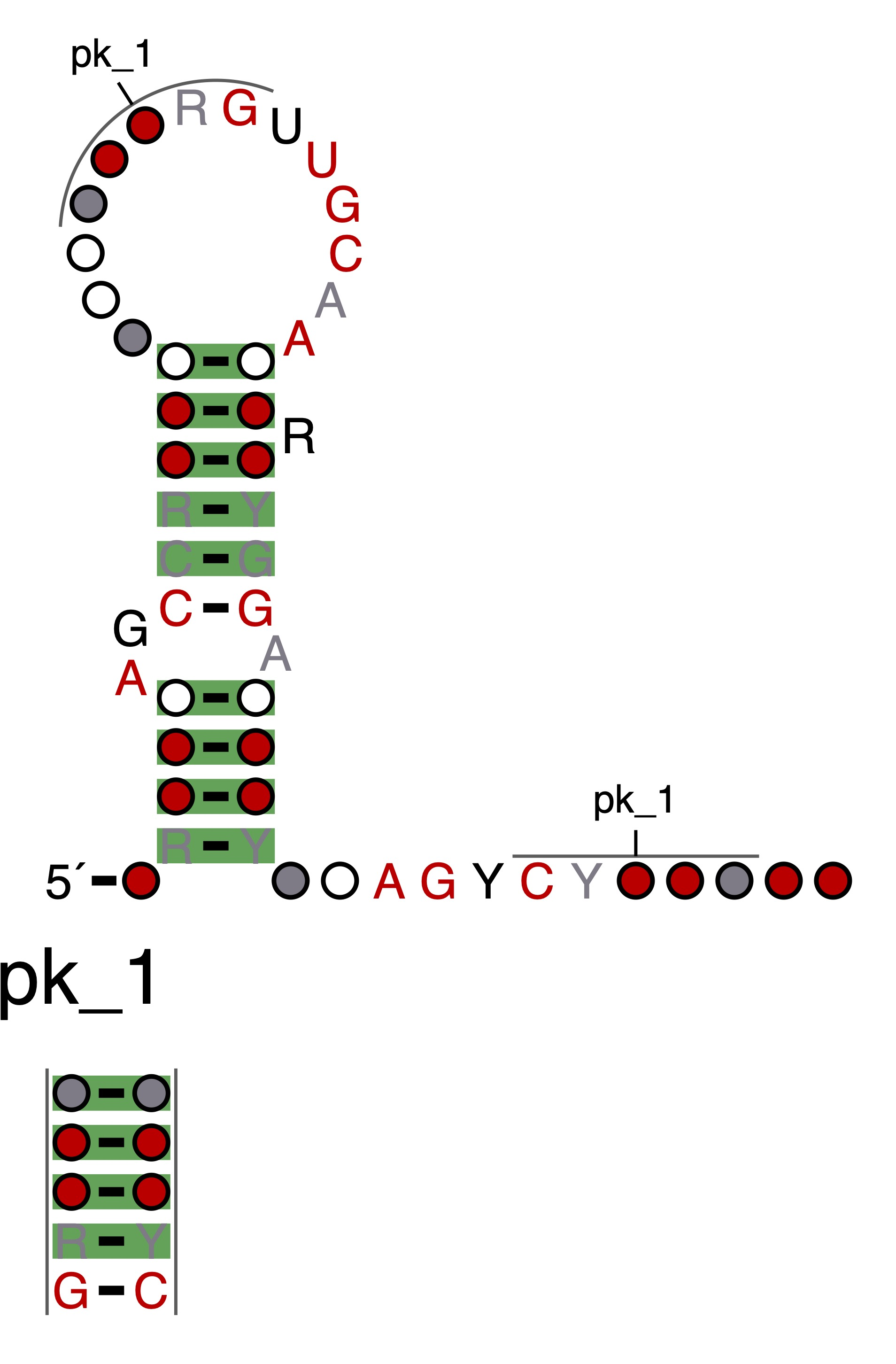
- Consensus secondary structure and sequence conservation of PV xrRNA

Identifiers
- Symbol: PV xrRNA
- Rfam: RF04326

Other data
- RNA type: Gene; sRNA; cis-reg
- GO: GO:0039694
- SO: SO:0000837
- PDB structures: PDBe 7JJU

Plant-infecting positive-strand RNA viruses from the Tombusviridae and Solemoviridae families contain Exoribonuclease-Resistant RNAs (xrRNAs), typically located at the beginning of the 3′ UTR or within the intergenic region (IGR) between open reading frames (ORF1 and ORF2). These plant-virus xrRNAs are distinct in sequence and secondary structure from flavivirus xrRNAs, representing a clear example of convergent evolution toward the same functional outcome of exoribonuclease resistance. They are classified as class 3 xrRNAs.

Plant-virus class 3 xrRNAs consist of a single stem-loop containing a pseudoknot between the apical stem and the 3′ end, reinforced by a conserved T-loop/D-loop interaction. Some variants additionally include a short downstream SL that is dispensable for nuclease-resistance. Despite the differences in sequence and secondary structure, the resulting three-dimensional fold forms a similar protective ring around the 5′ end that blocks degradation.

xrRNAs have been identified in Red clover necrotic mosaic virus (RCNMV), as well as in major agricultural pathogens including Potato leafroll virus (PLRV), Maize chlorotic mottle virus (MCMV), and Maize yellow dwarf virus-RMV (MYDV-RMV, formerly BYDV-RMV). Loss of xrRNA function leads to severely impaired viral replication, emphasizing their essential role in viral fitness and translational regulation.
