= Pp1 =

PP1 may refer to:

- Proton–proton chain reaction
- Protein phosphatase 1
- Constituency PP-1 (Rawalpindi-I) a Constituency of Provincial Assembly of Punjab
- Ribonuclease PP1

== See also ==
- 1-PP
- 1PP
