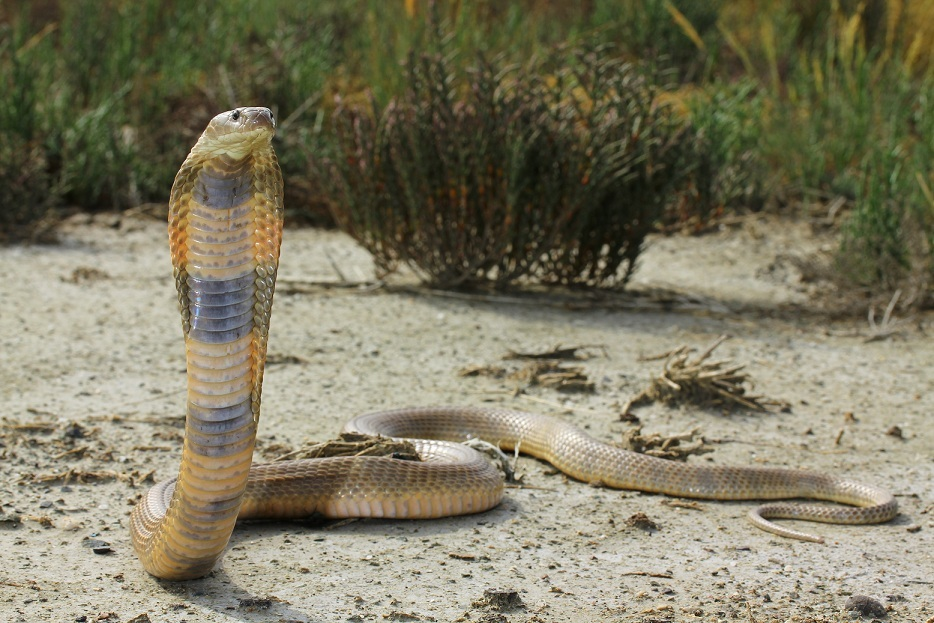

Conservation status
- Near Threatened (IUCN 3.1)
- CITES Appendix II

Scientific classification
- Kingdom: Animalia
- Phylum: Chordata
- Class: Reptilia
- Order: Squamata
- Suborder: Serpentes
- Family: Elapidae
- Genus: Naja
- Species: N. oxiana

Binomial name
- Naja oxiana (Eichwald, 1831)

Synonyms
- Naja naja subsp. oxiana (Eichwald, 1831); Naja tripudians var. caeca Boulenger, 1896; Tomyris oxiana Eichwald, 1831

= Caspian cobra =

Species of snake

The Caspian cobra (Naja oxiana), also called the Persian cobra or Russian cobra, is a species of highly venomous snake in the family Elapidae. The species is endemic to Central Asia. First described by Karl Eichwald, a German physician, in 1831, it was for many years considered to be a subspecies of the Naja naja until genetic analysis revealed it to be a distinct species.

== Taxonomy ==
Karl Eichwald, a Baltic German, having been born modern day Saint Petersburg, Russia, who was a physician and naturalist first described the Caspian cobra originally as Tomyris oxiana in 1831. Russian naturalist Alexander Strauch placed it in the genus Naja in 1868. The generic name naja is a Latinisation of the Sanskrit word nāgá (नाग) meaning "cobra". The specific epithet oxiana is derived from the word Ōxus in Latin or Ὦξος (Ôxos) in Greek, and refers to the ancient name of the river Amu Darya which flows along Afghanistan`s northern border separating it from Tajikistan and Uzbekistan before turning northwest into Turkmenistan and flows from there into the southern remnants of the Aral Sea in Central Asia (Transoxiana), where this species occurs. For most of the twentieth century, all Asiatic cobras were considered to be subspecies of the Indian cobra (Naja naja); during this period, the subspecific names N. naja oxiana and N. naja caeca were applied to plain-scaled populations of N. naja from the north of India as well as populations corresponding to the Caspian cobra. Highly variable coloration and size within individual species made classification difficult until the advent of genetic analysis.

A mitochondrial DNA study of Asiatic cobras in the subgenus Naja showed the Caspian cobra diverged from a lineage that gave rise to the monocled cobra (Naja kaouthia) and the Andaman cobra (Naja sagittifera) around 3.21 million years ago. The species itself appears to be genetically homogeneous despite population separation caused by the Hindu Kush mountains; this suggests a recent rapid range expansion.

- Naja
  - (Naja)
    - Naja (Naja) naja
    - - - Naja (Naja) kaouthia
        - Naja (Naja) atra
        - Naja (Naja) sagittifera
        - Naja (Naja) oxiana
      - - Naja (Naja) sputatrix
        - - - Naja (Naja) samarensis
            - Naja (Naja) philippinensis
          - - Naja (Naja) mandalayensis
            - - Naja (Naja) sumatrana
              - Naja (Naja) siamensis
  - - (Afronaja)
      - - Naja (Afronaja) pallida
        - Naja (Afronaja) nubiae
      - - Naja (Afronaja) katiensis
        - - Naja (Afronaja) nigricollis
          - - Naja (Afronaja) ashei
            - - Naja (Afronaja) mossambica
              - Naja (Afronaja) nigricincta
    - - (Boulengerina)
        - Naja (Boulengerina) multifasciata
        - - - Naja (Boulengerina) christyi
            - Naja (Boulengerina) annulata
          - - - Naja (Boulengerina) savannula
              - Naja (Boulengerina) subfulva
            - - Naja (Boulengerina) guineensis
              - Naja (Boulengerina) peroescobari
              - Naja (Boulengerina) melanoleuca
      - (Uraeus)
        - Naja (Uraeus) nivea
        - - Naja (Uraeus) senegalensis
          - - Naja (Uraeus) haje
            - Naja (Uraeus) arabica
          - - Naja (Uraeus) annulifera
            - Naja (Uraeus) anchietae

== Description ==
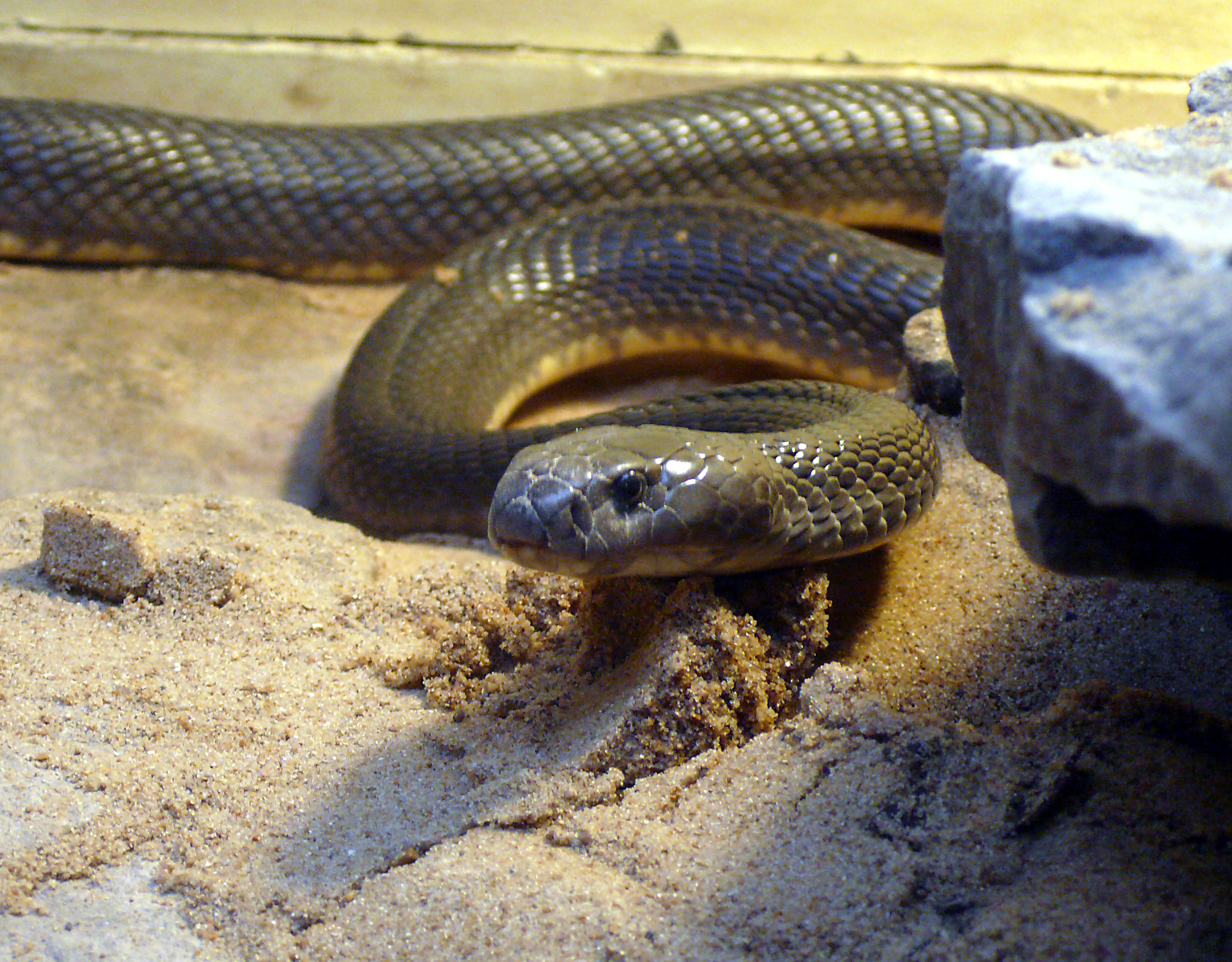
A Caspian cobra

Naja oxiana is medium in length, a heavy-bodied snake with long cervical ribs capable of expansion to form a hood. Anteriorly, the body is depressed dorsoventrally, and posteriorly it is subcylindrical. This species is similar in size to Naja naja, averaging about 1 to 1.4 m (3.3 to 4.6 ft) in total length (including tail) and rarely reaches lengths over 1.7 m (5.6 ft). The head is elliptical, depressed, and slightly distinct from the neck, with a short, rounded snout and large nostrils. The eye is medium in size with a round pupil. The dorsal scales are smooth and strongly oblique, with the outer two or three scale rows larger than the remainder. The hood of N. oxiana has an elongated, gradually tapering shape in contrast to the more ovoid hoods of some other Naja species (Naja naja or Naja kaouthia). Juveniles tend to be pale, with a faded appearance. Juveniles have noticeable dark and light cross-bands of approximately equal width around the body. Adults of this species are completely light to chocolate brown or yellowish, with some specimens retaining traces of juvenile banding, especially the first few dark ventral bands. This species has no hood marks and no lateral throat spots.

Confusions may exist with the Indian cobra (Naja naja), as specimens without a hood mark are usually confused with this species, and these two species coexist in Pakistan and northern India. The Caspian cobra (Naja oxiana) is never fully black, although some specimens may be quite dark. The Caspian cobra (N. oxiana) normally has several dark bands under the throat, whereas in the black phase of the Indian cobra (N. naja) from Pakistan, almost the entire throat is black. The hood has an elongate, gradually tapering shape in contrast to the more ovoid hoods of some other Naja species (Naja naja or Naja kaouthia).

=== Scalation ===
The number and pattern of scales on a snake's body are a key element of identification to species level. Naja oxiana males have 23 to 27 (usually 25) dorsal scale rows at the hood, 19–23 (usually 21) just ahead of midbody, 193–207 ventrals, and 63–71 paired subcaudals; cuneate scales (small angular scales between the labials) are often absent, but one cuneate scale on each side in specimens from India and Pakistan. Females males have 23 to 26 dorsal scale rows (at the hood), 19–21 ahead of midbody, 191–210 ventrals, and 57–70 paired subcaudals.

== Distribution and habitat ==
Naja oxiana occurs in the Transcaspian region. It is found throughout Turkmenistan, Uzbekistan, Kyrgyzstan, southwestern Tajikistan, the Fergana Valley, north and east Afghanistan, and northeastern Iran. In Iran, it occurs from East Azerbaijan Province, southern half of Ardabil Province to the Provinces of Zanjan and Tehran all the way to the eastern half of both Isfahan and Yazd Provinces, as well the northeastern parts of Kerman Province, northern part of Sistan and Baluchistan Province, throughout the Provinces of Semnan, Mazandaran, and Golestan the entire former Province of Khorasan, which was split into three separate provinces post-2004). Although this species is found throughout much of Pakistan, from Balochistan and Sindh to Gilgit-Baltistan and Azad Kashmir, it is far more common in the northern half of Pakistan. This species has also been observed in far northwest India in Jammu and Kashmir (union territory) and also been observed in the state of Himachal Pradesh. It's also highly suspected to have occurred in Ladakh, and in the Indian state of Punjab. There is also anecdotal evidence of it ranging as far north as Kazakhstan's southern border with Uzbekistan, according to Brian Hayes, a biochemical engineer with the United States Threat Reduction Agency. Hayes led an expedition to Vozrozhdeniye Island in the Aral Sea in the summer of 2002 to bury anthrax on the island, which is located in the Aral Sea and is split between Uzbekistan and Kazakhstan, with the northern half of the island belonging to Kazakhstan. Mr. Hayes mentioned a 2.4 m (7.9 ft) long cobra that was observed and shot near the tents where the staff lived. "In all, we had run-ins with about 25 [venomous] snakes". The only "cobra" species which occurs in this region is Naja oxiana, so any "cobra" observed in Kazakhstan would likely be of this species.

Naja oxiana is often found in arid and semiarid, rocky or stony, shrub- or scrub-covered foothills at elevations up to about 3,000 m (9,800 ft) above sea level. This is also the westernmost species of Asiatic cobra.

== Ecology ==
=== Behavior ===
Naja oxiana tends to avoid humans as much as it can, but it can become fiercely defensive when threatened or cornered, and even juveniles tend to be very aggressive. When cornered and provoked, it is liable to spread its hood, hiss, sway from side to side and strike repeatedly; however, it cannot spit venom. This terrestrial species is mainly diurnal, but it may be crepuscular and nocturnal in some parts of its range during the hottest month (July). Caspian cobras are good climbers, and able swimmers. The Caspian cobra is often found in water and seldom found too far away from it. Quick-moving and agile, this species lives in holes in embankments or trees.

=== Diet ===
The Caspian Cobra feeds mostly on small mammals, amphibians, occasionally fish, birds and their eggs. It also reportedly feeds on other snakes.

== Venom ==
=== Composition ===
The Caspian cobra is considered to be the most venomous species of cobra in the world. Several different toxinological studies suggest this, including one particular study reported in the Indian Journal of Experimental Biology in 1992. A study analyzing the toxic fractions of Naja oxiana venom from Iran indicated that toxic fractions constituted 78% by weight of crude venom of this species, similar to Naja naja. The toxic fractions were composed of three protein families, among which the 3FTs was dominant, similar to all other Naja species. The venom of N. oxiana was rich in short neurotoxins, which make up the majority of crude venom. A number of small nonenzymatic proteins are found in the venom, including neurotoxins and members of the cytotoxin family, which have been shown to cause cell death through damage to lysosomes.

In addition to nonenzymatic proteins, the venom also contains nucleases, which cause tissue damage at the site of the bite and may also potentiate systemic toxicity by releasing free purines in situ. A ribonuclease isolated and purified from Caspian cobra venom, ribonuclease V1, is commonly used as a laboratory reagent in molecular biology experiments due to its unusual ability to break down structured RNA.

N. oxiana is one of the most dangerous snakes belonging to the elapidae family. Two main toxins as well as a number of minor components and three basic polypeptides similar to cardiotoxins (CTXs) and cytotoxins were isolated from the crude venom of this species, with acute effects on cardiac system during the first few hours post-envenomation. There are a few case reports of acute myocardial infarction (MI) following bites from elapids. At least one case of myocardial infarction following a bite from a Caspian cobra is recorded.

=== Toxic effects ===
Naja oxiana is regarded as the most dangerous snake in Central Asia and is one of the venomous snakes with a high mortality rate. It is one of the most dangerous elapid species in the world. A bite from this species will cause severe pain and swelling at the site of the bite, along with the rapid onset of prominent neurotoxicity. Weakness, drowsiness, ataxia, hypotension, and paralysis of the throat and limbs may appear in less than one hour after the bite. In a study, the first signs and symptoms of envenomation appeared within 15 minutes post-envenomation. Without medical treatment, symptoms rapidly worsen and death can occur soon after a bite due to respiratory failure. As with all species of cobra, there is great variation in venom toxicity and composition based on diet and geographical location. Venom toxicity is highest (least lethal) among specimens in the eastern parts of their geographical range (Indian and Pakistani specimens) with a value of around 0.2 mg/kg. Specimens from Iran, Uzbekistan, northeastern Afghanistan, and Turkmenistan can have considerably more potent venoms. The onset of symptoms is rapid and are extremely painful. Without treatment, death is likely and depending on the nature of the bite, the potency of the venom and the amount, death can occur in as little as 45 minutes or may be prolonged for up to 24 hours.

According to a 2019 study by Kazemi-Lomedasht et al., the murine LD_{50} via subcutaneous injection value for Naja oxiana (Iranian specimens) was estimated to be 0.14 mg/kg (0.067-0.21 mg/kg) more potent than the sympatric Pakistani Naja naja karachiensis (0.22 mg/kg), the Thai Naja kaouthia (0.2 mg/kg), and Naja philippinensis at 0.18 mg/kg (0.11-0.3 mg/kg) An older study by Zug et al listed a LD_{50} value of 0.2 mg/kg from Pakistani and Indian specimens. Average venom yield per bite for this species is between 75 and 125 mg (dry weight), while in other parts of its distribution venom yield average is between 150 and 225 mg (dry weight). The highest single bite yields are between 590 and 784 mg (dry weight). The crude venom of N. oxiana has a lowest published lethal dose (LCLo) of 0.005 mg/kg, the lowest among all cobra species, derived from an individual case of poisoning by intracerebroventricular injection.

Between 1979 and 1987, 136 confirmed bites were attributed to this species in the former Soviet Union. Of the 136, 121 received antivenom, and only 8 died (6.6%). Of the 15 who did not receive antivenom, 11 died (an untreated mortality rate of 73%). In Iran, where the Caspian cobra is widespread, it is responsible for the highest number of deaths due to snakebite in the country. The Levant viper, Saw-scaled viper, and the Persian horned viper are responsible for more snakebite incidents, but they have a lower mortality rate compared to N. oxiana. Multiplying habitat suitability models of the four snakes showed that the northeast of Iran (west of Khorasan-e-Razavi province) has the highest snakebite risk in the country. In addition, villages that were at risk of envenoming from the four snakes were identified. Results revealed that 51,112 villages are at risk of envenoming from M. lebetinus (Levant viper), 30,339 from E. carinatus (saw-scaled viper), 51,657 from P. persicus (Persian horned viper) and 12,124 from N. oxiana (Caspian cobra). A study reported 53,787 cases of bites by venomous snakes between 2002 and 2011 in Iran, with the highest rate of snakebite incidents being found in provinces in the south and southwest of Iran. Out of the 53,787 cases of snake bites which were reported to medical centers in Iran, only 118 were correctly identified as bites by this species. In total there were 67 deaths, 51 of which were due to N. oxiana. Out of the 51 bites, 46 didn't receive medical treatment. One 10-year-old male died en route to the closest hospital ~35 minutes post-envenomation. Five were treated with antivenom, but succumbed to the venom regardless of the fact (~7% mortality despite treatment). Untreated mortality rates seem to be particularly high for a species within the genus Naja, at around ~80%. In Pakistan, it is responsible for high rates of snakebites that result in mortality. Reliable figures on incidence, morbidity and mortality are limited but almost 40,000 biting cases are reported annually which result in up to 8,200 fatalities in one study. An estimate of annual mortality rate in Pakistan is around 1.9 per 100,000 population. In one survey, it was reported that out of 5,337 envenomed patients, 57% were cobra victims and the remaining rest of 35% were bitten by kraits and vipers. Of the 5,337 envenomed patients, there were 3,064 cobra (N. naja and N. oxiana) victims. Out of the 3,064 bitten by cobras (841 correctly identified as N. naja, and 384 were correctly identified as N. oxiana). There were 78 untreated cases, of which 64 were fatal (82%), much higher than untreated cases for N. naja (33.6%). A woman bitten by this species in northwestern Pakistan suffered prominent neurotoxicity and died while en route to the closest hospital nearly 50 minutes after envenomation (death occurred 45–50 minutes post envenomation). Antivenom is not as effective for envenomation by this species as it is for other Asiatic cobras within the same region, like the Indian cobra (N. naja), and due to the dangerous toxicity of this species' venom, massive amounts of antivenom are often required for patients. As a result, a monovalent antivenom serum is being developed by the Razi Vaccine and Serum Research Institute in Iran. Response to treatment with antivenom is generally poor among patients, so mechanical ventilation and endotracheal intubation is required. As a result, mortality among those treated for N. oxiana envenomation is still relatively high (up to 30%) compared to all other species of cobra (<1%).
