= REXO2 =

Protein-coding gene in humans

Identifiers
- Aliases: REXO2, REX2, RFN, SFN, CGI-114, RNA exonuclease 2
- External IDs: OMIM: 607149; MGI: 1888981; GeneCards: REXO2

Gene location (Human)
Chr.	Chromosome 11 (human)
Band	11q23.2	Start	114,439,435 bp
Band	11q23.2	End	114,450,279 bp

Gene location (Mouse)
Chr.	Chromosome 9 (mouse)
Band	9|9 A5.3	Start	48,379,812 bp
Band	9|9 A5.3	End	48,391,923 bp
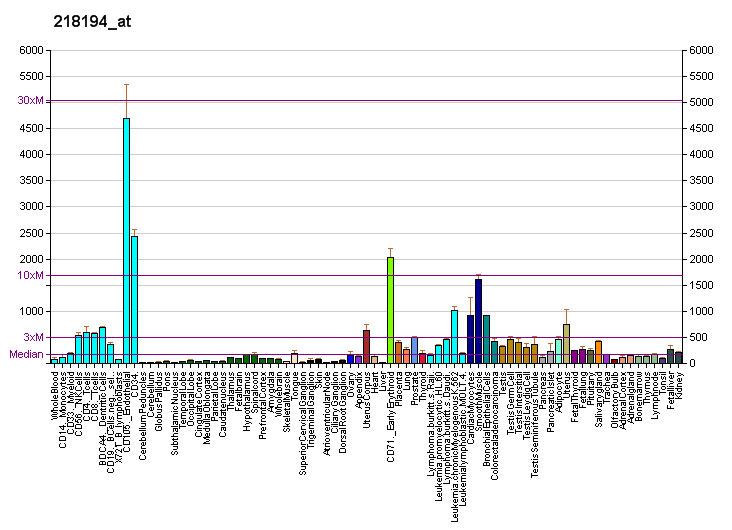
RNA expression pattern
Bgee	Human / Mouse (ortholog); Top expressed in: secondary oocyte; decidua; Achilles tendon; stromal cell of endometrium; right ventricle; smooth muscle tissue; vena cava; saphenous vein; parotid gland; kidney tubule / Top expressed in: lacrimal gland; ascending aorta; hair follicle; yolk sac; aortic valve; molar; salivary gland; endothelial cell of lymphatic vessel; submandibular gland; parotid gland; More reference expression data
BioGPS	More reference expression data
Gene ontology
Molecular function	nuclease activity; exonuclease activity; hydrolase activity; 3'-5' exonuclease activity; nucleic acid binding; 3'-5'-exoribonuclease activity
Cellular component	cytoplasm; mitochondrial matrix; mitochondrial intermembrane space; nucleolus; nucleus; focal adhesion; mitochondrion
Biological process	nucleobase-containing compound metabolic process; nucleotide metabolic process; nucleic acid phosphodiester bond hydrolysis; RNA phosphodiester bond hydrolysis, exonucleolytic
Sources:Amigo / QuickGO
Orthologs
Databases	NCBI: entry; OMA: entry
Species	Human	Mouse
Entrez	25996	104444
Ensembl	ENSG00000076043	ENSMUSG00000032026
UniProt	Q9Y3B8	Q9D8S4
RefSeq (mRNA)	NM_015523	NM_024233; NM_001357501; NM_001357503; NM_001357505
RefSeq (protein)	NP_056338	NP_077195; NP_001344430; NP_001344432; NP_001344434
Location (UCSC)	Chr 11: 114.44 – 114.45 Mb	Chr 9: 48.38 – 48.39 Mb
PubMed search
- Wikidata
View/Edit Human	View/Edit Mouse

REX2, RNA exonuclease 2 homolog (S. cerevisiae), also known as REXO2, is an enzyme which in humans is encoded by the REXO2 gene.

== Function ==
Nucleases are components of DNA and RNA metabolism that carry out functions in DNA repair, replication, and recombination and in RNA processing and degradation. SFN is a homolog of Orn, a 3-prime-to-5-prime exoribonuclease of E. coli that attacks the free 3-prime hydroxyl group on single-stranded RNA, releasing 5-prime mono-nucleotides in a sequential manner.
