= YqaJ protein domain =

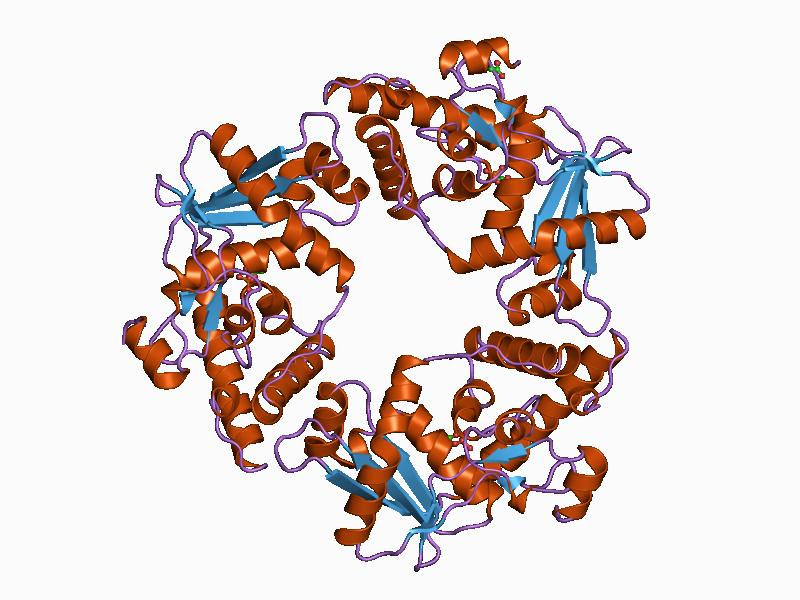
- Toroidal structure of lambda exonuclease, determined at 2.4 angstroms

Identifiers
- Symbol: YqaJ
- Pfam: PF09588
- Pfam clan: CL0236
- InterPro: IPR019080
Available protein structures:
- PDB: IPR019080 PF09588 (ECOD; PDBsum)
- AlphaFold: IPR019080; PF09588

In molecular biology, the YqaJ refers to the YqaJ/K domain from the skin prophage of the bacterium, Bacillus subtilis. This protein domain, often found in bacterial species, is actually of viral origin. The protein forms an oligomer and functions as an alkaline exonuclease, or in simpler terms, an enzyme that digests double-stranded DNA. It is a reaction which is dependent on Magnesium. It has a preference for 5'-phosphorylated DNA ends. It thus forms part of the two-component SynExo viral recombinase functional unit.

== Function ==
The function of this protein domain is to digest DNA. Most viruses, inject their host with linear DNA, and this gets incorporated into the host genome through the process of recombination. This recombination is crucial to viral replication.

DNA exonucleases have roles to play in DNA metabolism, such as: replication, repair, and recombination.

== Structure ==
YqaJ is one of three protein subunits that form a toroid with a tapered channel passing through the middle. The channel changes diameter, the wide end of the channel being about 30 Å, and the narrow end decreasing to 15 Å. It is thought that the tapered channel is large enough to accommodate double-stranded DNA at the wide end but only single-stranded DNA at the other end. Furthermore, YqaJ has an alpha/beta fold.

== SynExo ==
SynExo is a viral recombinase functional unit. It is thought that it may have evolved as a portable module that can function wide variety of host organisms without requiring extensive interaction with host-specific functions. This offers the pathogen a great adaptive advantage on viruses exploring new niches.
