= Ribonuclease II =

Ribonuclease II may refer to one of two enzymes:

- Ribonuclease T2
- Exoribonuclease II
