= Deoxyribonuclease IV =

Class of enzymes

Deoxyribonuclease IV (phage-T4-induced)

Identifiers
- EC no.: 3.1.21.2
- CAS no.: 63363-78-0

Databases
- IntEnz: IntEnz view
- BRENDA: BRENDA entry
- ExPASy: NiceZyme view
- KEGG: KEGG entry
- MetaCyc: metabolic pathway
- PRIAM: profile
- PDB structures: RCSB PDB PDBe PDBsum
Search
- PMC: articles
- PubMed: articles
- NCBI: proteins

Deoxyribonuclease IV (phage-T4-induced) (EC 3.1.21.2, endodeoxyribonuclease IV (phage T4-induced), E. coli endonuclease IV, endodeoxyribonuclease, redoxyendonuclease, deoxriboendonuclease, Escherichia coli endonuclease II, endonuclease II, DNA-adenine-transferase) is catalyzes the degradation nucleotides in DsDNA by attacking the 5'-terminal end.

Deoxyribonuclease IV is a type of deoxyribonuclease that has both an exonucleolytic and an endonucleolytic activity. It functions at abasic or apurinic-apyrimidinic sites when the cell is undergoing nucleotide excision repair pathway. In addition, the endonuclease IV consists of several activities such as AP endonuclease, 3'-diesterase, 3'->5' exonuclease, and 3'phosphatase.

The endonuclease IV is encoded by denB of bacteriophage T4 and its binding sequence is 5′-dT||dCdAdCdTdTdC-3′. It has been discovered that serine 176 residue plays a crucial role in increasing the hydrolysis rate of the endonuclease of a consensus sequence containing cytidine. The endonuclease IV falls under a structurally resembling members with apyrimidininc endonuclease I (APE1).

== Discovery ==
Deoxyribonuclease IV was first isolated from rabbit tissues in 1968. Specifically, it was found in rabbit bone marrow by Lindahl. And its molecular weight was determined to be 42,000 dalton. It was discovered that this enzyme resembles several microbial endonuclease activities of DNA polymerase I found in Escherichia coli, which appear to be necessary for DNA repair and recombination. It also resembles gamma exonuclease, which performs an important function in recombination of bacteriophage.

== Structure ==
DNase IV is composed of 185 amino acid residues with magnesium ions acting as a cofactor. Divalent metal ions such as Mg²⁺ act as cofactor during the cleavage of 5'-mononucleotides. DNase IV prefers to attack native DNA acting as an endonuclease with metal ions either Mg++ or Mn++. Its TIM beta barrel core surrounded by helices with three metal ions —either three Zn2+ or two Zn2+ and one Mn2+ which plays crucial role in AP excision repair.

== Function ==
DNase IV attacks dsDNA at 5' ends by liberating 5' mononucleotides but it does not attack any monomers in polydeoxyribonucleotides in a random fashion. It cleaves polydeoxyribonucleotides in an exonucleolytic fashion from 5' end, meaning it removes a nucleotide chain that is adjacent to the 5' terminal end rather than cleaving a nucleotide located in the middle of the chain. DNase IV works by attacking multiple polynucleotide chains at the same time. Since it does not cleave dsDNA in a processive way, the rate of hydrolysis of this enzyme is faster than native DNA in terms of kinetics. DNase IV does not recognize specific sequences on DNA for non-staggered cleavage. However, it requires two base pairs at one cleavage site, and the other cleavage site of double-stranded DNA should have more than 10 base pairs.

== Enzyme Activities in cell environment and DNA ==
70% of the total DNase IV activity was found in the cytoplasm while 30% was found in cell nuclei. In human body, DNase IV was required for cleavage of a reaction intermediate generated by template strand displacement during gap-filling.

During the endonuclease activity, conformational change in DNA occurs in a way that exposes the abasic site by bending the DNA by 90 degrees, which involves flipping out the sugar moiety into a small pocket that would not form watson-crick base pair.

DNase IV acts on double stranded DNA in repair by breaking phosphodiester bonds, but the number of cleavages by this enzyme is smaller than the extent of polymerization of DNA.

== Difference between DNase III vs. DNase IV ==
In crude cell extracts from lymphoid organs, DNase III and DNase IV show major activities because DNase I activity is inhibited. The activities of DNase III and DNase IV depend on two Mg++ as cofactors and these enzymes are localized in cell nuclei. Even though they require same divalent metal to function, there are major difference in liberating polynucleotides. DNase III cleaves a single strand of DNA from 3' terminal end but DNase IV cleaves a double strand of DNA from 5' terminal end. Because DNase III degrades single stranded DNA, the rate of hydrolysis of DNase III is more rapid than that of DNase IV.

== See also ==
- Phage T4
