= Endoribonuclease XendoU =

XendoU
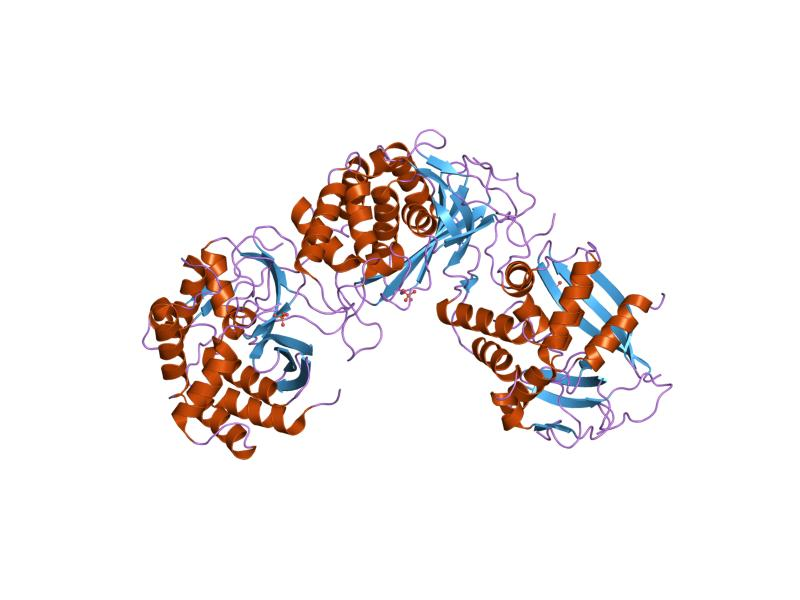
- the structure of xendou: a splicing independent snorna processing endoribonuclease

Identifiers
- Symbol: XendoU
- Pfam: PF09412
- InterPro: IPR018998
Available protein structures:
- PDB: IPR018998 PF09412 (ECOD; PDBsum)
- AlphaFold: IPR018998; PF09412

In molecular biology, Endoribonuclease XendoU refers to a protein domain. This particular entry represents endoribonucleases involved in RNA biosynthesis which has been named XendoU in Xenopus laevis (African clawed frog). This protein domain belongs to a family of evolutionarily related proteins. XendoU is a U-specific metal dependent enzyme that produces products with a 2'-3' cyclic phosphate termini.

== Function ==
The endonuclease, XendoU, is highly involved in the biosynthesis of a specific subclass of Xenopus laevis encoded small nucleolar RNAs (snoRNA) which are a large family of non-coding RNAs with essential roles in ribosome biogenesis. Most snoRNAs are encoded in introns and are released through the splicing reaction. Others, instead, produced by an alternative pathway consisting of endonucleolytic processing of pre-mRNA. XendoU, is the endoribonuclease responsible for this activity.

The XendoU-RNA complex is manganese (Mn^{2+})-independent. This infers that RNA binding and processing activities can be functionally separated since ions are essential for cleavage.

== Structure ==
XendoU is a single-domain protein with roughly globular shape. It contains nine alpha helices and three antiparallel beta sheets; the latter are clustered on one side of the protein.

== Homology ==
XendoU has no homology to any known cellular RNase. However, it has sequence similarity with proteins tentatively annotated as serine proteases.
