= Flavivirus 5' UTR =

Untranslated regions in the genome of viruses in the genus Flavivirus

Flavivirus-5UTR
- Consensus secondary structure and sequence conservation of Flavivirus 5' UTR

Identifiers
- Symbol: Flavivirus-5UTR
- Rfam: RF03546

Other data
- RNA type: Cis-reg
- GO: GO:0039694
- SO: SO:0000205
- PDB structures: PDBe

Flavivirus 5' UTR are untranslated regions in the genome of viruses in the genus Flavivirus.

== Background ==
The Flavivirus positive-oriented, single-stranded RNA genome has a length of 10,000 - 11,000 bases. The genus includes human pathogens like Zika virus, West-Nile virus, Dengue virus, Yellow Fever virus and other.

The 5' UTR of flaviviruses are highly structured, has a length of approximately 100 nucleotides and harbors two conserved RNA secondary structures which are vital for the viral life cycle. During replication, the 5' UTR interacts with the 3' UTR of the genome to initiate synthesis of new viral replicates and viral protein translation. In direct adjacency to the 5' UTR lies the cHP structure, which is essential for the viral replication.

== 5'SLA ==
The first structural element is termed 5'SLA and comprises three stems (S1, S2, S3) folded as L-shaped-like stem structure, and a side structure domain (SSD). Its overall length is around 70 nucleotides. Disruption experiments of S1 and S2 led to a stop of viral replication. Further, SLA is the promoter for RNA synthesis and interacts with the viral protein NS5 during circularization of the viral genome. After recruitment of NS5, the two loop regions of S3 (TL) and SSD (SSL) are considered to interact with NS5 to promote polymerase activity. Despite the diversity of SSD, its stable structure is essential for infectivity.

== 5'SLB ==
The second element is termed 5'SLB and contains the translation initiation codon at the top region of the stem loop. It further contains the 5'UAR (upstream AUG region), which is essential for the circularization of the genome. The 5'UAR interacts with the 3'UAR, which is located at the 3' UTR of the genome to form a long-range RNA-RNA interaction.

== cHP ==
The capsid-coding hairpin region (cHP) actually lies in the ORF of the viral genome and is followed by the 5'CS (conserved sequence), which forms another long-range RNA-RNA interaction with the 3' UTR (3'CS). The cHP aids in the start codon recognition and viral replication. Studies show that the function of cHP is sequence-independent but structure-dependent.
