= Exonuclease III =

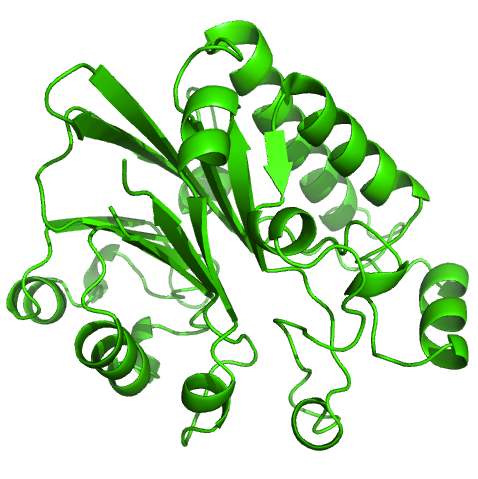
- Crystal structure of exonuclease III from E. coli.

Identifiers
- Organism: E. coli strain K-12/MG1655
- Symbol: xthA
- Alt. symbols: ExoIII
- Entrez: 946254
- RefSeq (Prot): NP_416263
- UniProt: P09030

Other data
- EC number: 3.1.11.2
- Chromosome: genome: 1.83 - 1.83 Mb
Search for
- Structures: Swiss-model
- Domains: InterPro

Exonuclease III (ExoIII) is an enzyme that belongs to the exonuclease family. ExoIII catalyzes the stepwise removal of mononucleotides from 3´-hydroxyl termini of double-stranded DNA. A limited number of nucleotides are removed during each binding event, resulting in coordinated progressive deletions within the population of DNA molecules.

== Function ==
The preferred substrates are blunt or recessed 3´-termini, although ExoIII also acts at nicks in duplex DNA to produce single-strand gaps. The enzyme is not active on single-stranded DNA, and thus 3´-protruding termini are resistant to cleavage. The degree of resistance depends on the length of the extension, with extensions 4 bases or longer being essentially resistant to cleavage. This property is used to produce unidirectional deletions from a linear molecule with one resistant (3´-overhang) and one susceptible (blunt or 5´-overhang) terminus.

ExoIII activity depends partially on the DNA helical structure and displays sequence dependence (C>A=T>G).

ExoIII has also been reported to have RNase H, 3´-phosphatase and AP-endonuclease activities.

== Current Studies ==
There are many different exonucleases and many are still to be discovered in bacteria, current studies are being conducted in E. coli. Many exonucleases fall into superfamilies with different domains of life proving that exonuclease III has shown to be ancient. Exonucleases evolved early in the history of life and have vital biological roles.

== Regulation ==
Temperature, salt concentration and the ratio of enzyme to DNA greatly affect enzyme activity, requiring reaction conditions to be tailored to specific applications.
