= RNase PhyM =

Type of endoribonuclease which is sequence specific for single stranded RNAs

RNase PhyM is a type of endoribonuclease which is sequence specific for single stranded RNAs. It cleaves 3'-end of unpaired A and U residues.
