= RNase R =

RNase R, or Ribonuclease R, is a 3'-->5' exoribonuclease, which belongs to the RNase II superfamily, a group of enzymes that hydrolyze RNA in the 3' - 5' direction. RNase R has been shown to be involved in selective mRNA degradation, particularly of non stop mRNAs in bacteria. RNase R has homologues in many other organisms.

When a part of another larger protein has a domain that is very similar to RNase R, this is called an RNase R domain.

== Role in trans-translation and ribosomal quality control ==
RNase R ensures translation accuracy, correct rRNA maturation and elimination of abnormal rRNAs, and is employed by the trans-translation system to break down damaged mRNAs.

In Escherichia coli, RNase R is a 92 kD protein, with the characteristic capacity to degrade structured RNA substrates without displaying sequence specificity. Therefore, RNase R acts over a range of substrates, such as, ribosomal, transfer, messenger and small non-coding RNAs. RNase R is associated with ribonucleoprotein complex that contains tmRNA and SmpB, and is involved in the development of tmRNA under cold-shock.

RNase R is also associated with ribosomes and participates in rRNA, or ribosomal RNA, quality control processes. RNase R has an in vitro affinity for rRNA. In several rRNA quality control pathways, RNase R behaves as a mainfactor by enhancing the removal of faulty rRNA molecules. This protein is also critical for handling rRNA precursors and for observing the ribosome integrity.

== RNA digestion ==
RNase R has two cold shock domains, an RNase catalytic domain, an S1 domain and a basic domain.

Overabundance of RNase R in a cell are harmful since RNase R is more active and more effective in breaking down RNAs than the other bacterial exoribonucleases, such as RNase II. Besides the substrate RNAs that construct double-stranded RNA with 3' overhangs shorter than seven nucleotides, RNase R can degrade all linear RNAs. For the methodical digestion of eukaryotic linear RNAs, RNase R is a good 3' to 5' exoribonuclease but there are infrequent cases of RNase R resistance. Since mRNAs are not chemically protected at their 3' ends, unlike the protection provided at their 5' ends by the cap structure, RNase R successfully degrades linear mRNAs from their unprotected 3' ends.
