= Bacillus subtilis ribonuclease =

Identifiers
- EC no.: 3.1.27.2

Databases
- IntEnz: IntEnz view
- BRENDA: BRENDA entry
- ExPASy: NiceZyme view
- KEGG: KEGG entry
- MetaCyc: metabolic pathway
- PRIAM: profile
- PDB structures: RCSB PDB PDBe PDBsum
Search
- PMC: articles
- PubMed: articles
- NCBI: proteins

Bacillus subtilis ribonuclease (EC 3.1.27.2, Proteus mirabilis RNase, ribonucleate nucleotido-2'-transferase (cyclizing)) is an enzyme. This enzyme catalyses the following chemical reaction

Endonucleolytic cleavage to 2',3'-cyclic nucleotides
