= Endoribonuclease =

Class of enzymes which cleave RNA

In biochemistry, an endoribonuclease is a class of enzyme which is a type of ribonuclease (an RNA cleaver), itself a type of endonuclease (a nucleotide cleaver). It cleaves either single-stranded or double-stranded RNA, depending on the enzyme. Example includes both single proteins such as RNase III, RNase A, RNase T1, RNase T2 and RNase H and also complexes of proteins with RNA such as RNase P and the RNA-induced silencing complex. Further examples include endoribonuclease XendoU found in frogs (Xenopus).
