= Ribonuclease V =

Identifiers
- EC no.: 3.1.27.8
- CAS no.: 74505-36-5

Databases
- IntEnz: IntEnz view
- BRENDA: BRENDA entry
- ExPASy: NiceZyme view
- KEGG: KEGG entry
- MetaCyc: metabolic pathway
- PRIAM: profile
- PDB structures: RCSB PDB PDBe PDBsum
Search
- PMC: articles
- PubMed: articles
- NCBI: proteins

Ribonuclease V (EC 3.1.27.8, endoribonuclease V) is an enzyme. This enzyme catalyses the following chemical reaction

Hydrolysis of poly(A), forming oligoribonucleotides and ultimately 3'-AMP

This enzyme also hydrolyses poly(U).
