= Ribonuclease T2 =

Class of enzymes

Identifiers
- EC no.: 3.1.27.1
- CAS no.: 37278-25-4

Databases
- IntEnz: IntEnz view
- BRENDA: BRENDA entry
- ExPASy: NiceZyme view
- KEGG: KEGG entry
- MetaCyc: metabolic pathway
- PRIAM: profile
- PDB structures: RCSB PDB PDBe PDBsum
Search
- PMC: articles
- PubMed: articles
- NCBI: proteins

Ribonuclease T2 (EC 3.1.27.1, acid ribonuclease, acid RNase, base-non-specific ribonuclease, Escherichia coli ribonuclease I' ribonuclease PP2, Escherichia coli ribonuclease II, non-base specific ribonuclease, nonbase-specific RNase, nonspecific RNase, ribonnuclease (non-base specific), ribonuclease (non-base specific), ribonuclease II, ribonuclease M, ribonuclease N2, ribonuclease PP3, ribonuclease U4, ribonucleate 3'-oligonucleotide hydrolase, ribonucleate nucleotido-2'-transferase (cyclizing), RNAase CL, RNase (non-base specific), RNase II, RNase M, RNase Ms, RNase T2, ) is an enzyme. It is a type of endoribonuclease. This enzyme catalyses the following chemical reaction

Two-stage endonucleolytic cleavage to nucleoside 3'-phosphates and 3'-phosphooligonucleotides with 2',3'-cyclic phosphate intermediates

== See also ==
- RNASET2
