= RNase D =

Ribonuclease D
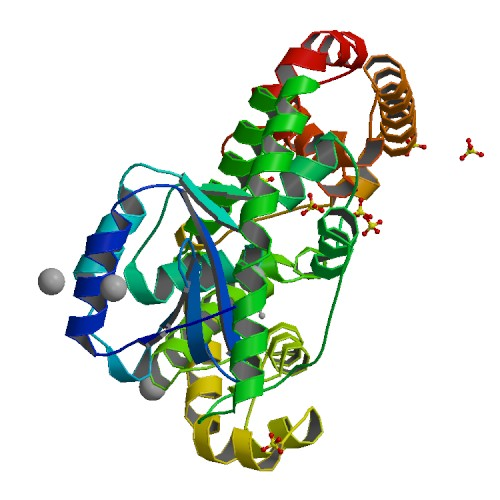
- Structure of the RNase D protein

Identifiers
- Symbol: RNASED

Other data
- EC number: 3.1.13.5

RNase D is one of the seven exoribonucleases identified in E. coli. It is a 3'-5' exoribonuclease which has been shown to be involved in the 3' processing of various stable RNA molecules. RNase D has homologues in many other organisms like eubacteria and eukaryotes, and has been shown to contribute to the 3' maturation of several stable RNAs. When a part of another larger protein has a domain that is very similar to RNase D, this is called an RNase D domain.
