= Oligonucleotidase =

Class of enzymes

Identifiers
- EC no.: 3.1.13.3
- CAS no.: 37288-23-6

Databases
- IntEnz: IntEnz view
- BRENDA: BRENDA entry
- ExPASy: NiceZyme view
- KEGG: KEGG entry
- MetaCyc: metabolic pathway
- PRIAM: profile
- PDB structures: RCSB PDB PDBe PDBsum
Search
- PMC: articles
- PubMed: articles
- NCBI: proteins

Oligonucleotidase (EC 3.1.13.3, oligoribonuclease) is an exoribonuclease derived from Flammulina velutipes. This enzyme catalyses the following chemical reaction

3'-end directed exonucleolytic cleavage of viral RNA-DNA hybrid
