= Exoribonuclease =

Class of enzymes that degrade RNA

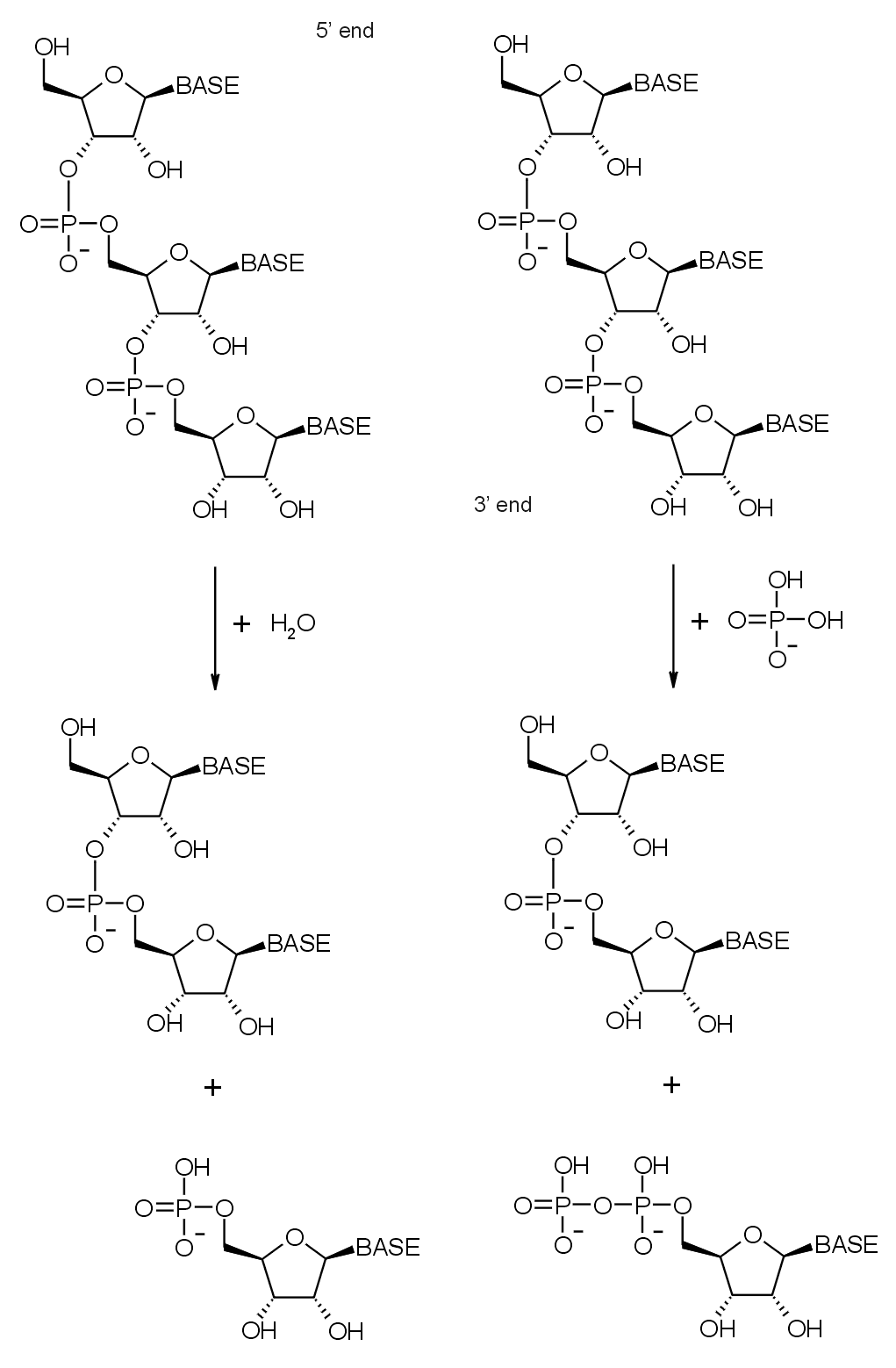
Reaction diagrams for both hydrolytic (left) and phosphorolytic (right) 3'-5' exoribonuclease degradation of RNA.

An exoribonuclease is an exonuclease ribonuclease, which are enzymes that degrade RNA by removing terminal nucleotides from either the 5' end or the 3' end of the RNA molecule. Enzymes that remove nucleotides from the 5' end are called 5'-3' exoribonucleases, and enzymes that remove nucleotides from the 3' end are called 3'-5' exoribonucleases.

Exoribonucleases can use either water to cleave the nucleotide-nucleotide bond (which is called hydrolytic activity) or inorganic phosphate (which is called phosphorolytic activity). Hydrolytic exoribonucleases are classified under EC number 3.1 and phosphorolytic exoribonucleases under EC number 2.7.7. As the phosphorolytic enzymes use inorganic phosphate to cleave bonds they release nucleotide diphosphates, whereas the hydrolytic enzymes (which use water) release nucleotide monosphosphates.

Exoribonucleases exist in all kingdoms of life, the bacteria, archaea, and eukaryotes. Exoribonucleases are involved in the degradation of many different RNA species, including messenger RNA, transfer RNA, ribosomal RNA and miRNA. Exoribonucleases can be single proteins (such as RNase D or RNase PH) but also can be complexes of multiple proteins, such as the exosome complex (in which four of the major exoribonuclease families are represented).

== Major families ==
Family	Example members	Distribution	Catalytic activity
RNR	RNase R	Most bacteria, all eukaryotes	3'-5' hydrolytic
RNR	RNase II	Most bacteria, all eukaryotes	3'-5' hydrolytic
RNR	Rrp44	Most bacteria, all eukaryotes	3'-5' hydrolytic
DEDD	RNase D	Certain bacteria, all eukaryotes	3'-5' hydrolytic
DEDD	RNase T	Certain bacteria, all eukaryotes	3'-5' hydrolytic
DEDD	PM/Scl-100	Certain bacteria, all eukaryotes	3'-5' hydrolytic
DEDD	Oligoribonuclease	Certain bacteria, all eukaryotes	3'-5' hydrolytic
RBN	RNase BN	Certain bacteria	3'-5' hydrolytic
PDX	PNPase	All kingdoms	3'-5' phosphorolytic
PDX	PM/Scl-75	All kingdoms	3'-5' phosphorolytic
PDX	RNase PH	All kingdoms	3'-5' phosphorolytic
RRP4	Rrp4	All eukaryotes, most archaea	3'-5' hydrolytic
5PX	Exoribonuclease I	All eukaryotes	5'-3' hydrolytic
5PX	Exoribonuclease II	All eukaryotes	5'-3' hydrolytic

== See also ==
- Endoribonuclease
- Nuclease
- Deoxyribonuclease
- Exodeoxyribonuclease
- Endodeoxyribonuclease
