= 5'-3' exoribonuclease 2 =

Protein-coding gene in the species Homo sapiens

XRN2

Identifiers
- Aliases: XRN2, entrez:22803, 5'-3' exoribonuclease 2
- External IDs: OMIM: 608851; MGI: 894687; GeneCards: XRN2

Gene location (Human)
Chr.	Chromosome 20 (human)
Band	20p11.22	Start	21,303,331 bp
Band	20p11.22	End	21,389,825 bp

Gene location (Mouse)
Chr.	Chromosome 2 (mouse)
Band	2|2 G2	Start	146,854,916 bp
Band	2|2 G2	End	146,919,920 bp
RNA expression pattern
Bgee	Human / Mouse (ortholog); Top expressed in: monocyte; ganglionic eminence; gonad; islet of Langerhans; smooth muscle tissue; Achilles tendon; appendix; gallbladder; ventricular zone; stromal cell of endometrium / Top expressed in: tail of embryo; yolk sac; Gonadal ridge; ventricular zone; ganglionic eminence; neural layer of retina; mandibular prominence; maxillary prominence; abdominal wall; spermatid; More reference expression data
BioGPS	n/a
Gene ontology
Molecular function	DNA binding; 5'-3' exoribonuclease activity; 5'-3' exonuclease activity; metal ion binding; protein binding; nucleic acid binding; nuclease activity; transcription termination site sequence-specific DNA binding; exonuclease activity; hydrolase activity; 3'-5'-exoribonuclease activity; RNA binding
Cellular component	membrane; aggresome; nucleolus; nucleus; nucleoplasm
Biological process	RNA processing; regulation of transcription, DNA-templated; DNA-templated transcription, termination; mRNA processing; RNA catabolic process; transcription, DNA-templated; DNA catabolic process, exonucleolytic; spermatogenesis; RNA metabolic process; nucleobase-containing compound metabolic process; neuron differentiation; retina development in camera-type eye; rRNA processing; RNA phosphodiester bond hydrolysis, exonucleolytic; hippocampus development
Sources:Amigo / QuickGO
Orthologs
Databases	NCBI: entry; OMA: entry
Species	Human	Mouse
Entrez	22803	24128
Ensembl	ENSG00000088930	ENSMUSG00000027433
UniProt	Q9H0D6	Q9DBR1
RefSeq (mRNA)	NM_012255; NM_001317960	NM_011917; NM_001356402; NM_001356403
RefSeq (protein)	NP_001304889; NP_036387	NP_036047; NP_001343331; NP_001343332
Location (UCSC)	Chr 20: 21.3 – 21.39 Mb	Chr 2: 146.85 – 146.92 Mb
PubMed search
- Wikidata
View/Edit Human	View/Edit Mouse

5'-3' Exoribonuclease 2 (XRN2) also known as Dhm1-like protein is an exoribonuclease enzyme that in humans is encoded by the XRN2 gene.

The human gene encoding XRN2 shares similarity with the mouse Dhm1 and the yeast's Dhp1 (Schizosaccharomyces pombe) or RAT1 (Saccharomyces) genes. The yeast gene is involved in homologous recombination and RNA metabolism, such as RNA synthesis and RNA trafficking and termination. Complementation studies show that Dhm1 has a similar function in mouse as Dhp1.

== Function ==
Human XRN2 is involved in the torpedo model of transcription termination.

The C. elegans homologue, XRN-2, is involved in the degradation of certain mature miRNAs and their dislodging from miRISC miRNAs.

In yeast, the Rat1 protein has been shown to also be involved in the torpedo transcription termination model. When a polyadenylation site has been detected on the nascent RNA and cleaved by the RNA polymerase II, the Rtt103 factor recruits Rat1 and attaches it to free end. The exonuclease activity of Rat1 degrades the RNA strand and halts transcriptions upon catching up to the polymerase.

== See also ==
- Xrn1
