= Exoribonuclease II =

Identifiers
- EC no.: 3.1.13.1
- CAS no.: 37288-24-7

Databases
- IntEnz: IntEnz view
- BRENDA: BRENDA entry
- ExPASy: NiceZyme view
- KEGG: KEGG entry
- MetaCyc: metabolic pathway
- PRIAM: profile
- PDB structures: RCSB PDB PDBe PDBsum
Search
- PMC: articles
- PubMed: articles
- NCBI: proteins

Exoribonuclease II (EC 3.1.13.1, ribonuclease II, ribonuclease Q, BN ribonuclease, Escherichia coli exo-RNase II, RNase II, exoribonuclease (misleading), 5'-exoribonuclease) is an enzyme. This enzyme catalyses the following chemical reaction

Exonucleolytic cleavage in the 3'- to 5'-direction to yield nucleoside 5'-phosphates

This enzyme has preference for single-stranded RNA.

== See also ==
- 5'-3' exoribonuclease 2
