= Exonuclease =

Class of enzymes; type of nuclease

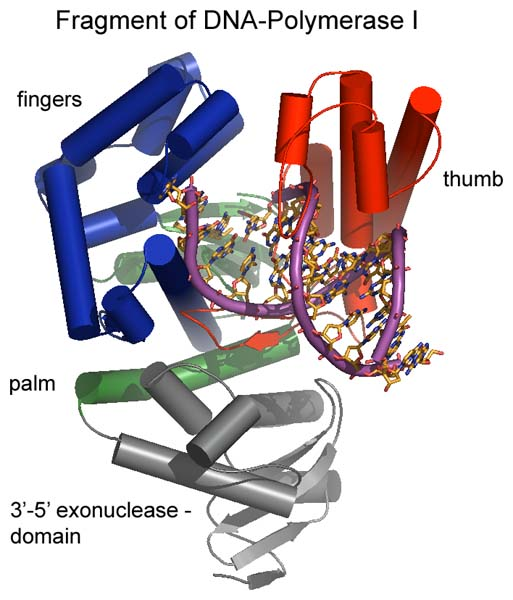
3′ to 5′ Exonuclease associated with Pol I

Exonucleases are enzymes that work by cleaving nucleotides one at a time from the end (exo) of a polynucleotide chain. A hydrolyzing reaction that breaks phosphodiester bonds at either the 3′ or the 5′ end occurs. Its close relative is the endonuclease, which cleaves phosphodiester bonds in the middle (endo) of a polynucleotide chain. Eukaryotes and prokaryotes have three types of exonucleases involved in the normal turnover of mRNA: 5′ to 3′ exonuclease (Xrn1), which is a dependent decapping protein; 3′ to 5′ exonuclease, an independent protein; and poly(A)-specific 3′ to 5′ exonuclease.

In both archaea and eukaryotes, one of the main routes of RNA degradation is performed by the multi-protein exosome complex, which consists largely of 3′ to 5′ exoribonucleases.

== Significance to polymerase ==
RNA polymerase II is known to be in effect during transcriptional termination; it works with a 5' exonuclease (human gene Xrn2) to degrade the newly formed transcript downstream, leaving the polyadenylation site and simultaneously shooting the polymerase. This process involves the exonuclease's catching up to the pol II and terminating the transcription.

Pol I then synthesizes DNA nucleotides in place of the RNA primer it had just removed. DNA polymerase I also has 3' to 5' and 5' to 3' exonuclease activity, which is used in editing and proofreading DNA for errors. The 3' to 5' can only remove one mononucleotide at a time, and the 5' to 3' activity can remove mononucleotides or up to 10 nucleotides at a time.

== E. coli types ==
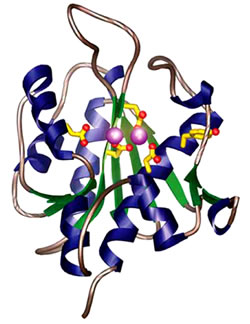
WRN Exonuclease with active sites in yellow

In 1971, Lehman IR discovered exonuclease I in E. coli. Since that time, there have been numerous discoveries including: exonuclease, II, III, IV, V, VI, VII, and VIII. Each type of exonuclease has a specific type of function or requirement.

Exonuclease I breaks apart single-stranded DNA in a 3' → 5' direction, releasing deoxyribonucleoside 5'-monophosphates one after another. It does not cleave DNA strands without terminal 3'-OH groups because they are blocked by phosphoryl or acetyl groups.

Exonuclease II is associated with DNA polymerase I, which contains a 5' exonuclease that clips off the RNA primer contained immediately upstream from the site of DNA synthesis in a 5' → 3' manner.

Exonuclease III has four catalytic activities:

- 3' to 5' exodeoxyribonuclease activity, which is specific for double-stranded DNA
- RNase activity
- 3' phosphatase activity
- AP endonuclease activity (later found to be called endonuclease II).

Exonuclease IV adds a water molecule, so it can break the bond of an oligonucleotide to nucleoside 5' monophosphate. This exonuclease requires Mg 2+ in order to function and works at higher temperatures than exonuclease I.

Exonuclease V is a 3' to 5' hydrolyzing enzyme that catalyzes linear double-stranded DNA and single-stranded DNA, which requires Ca2+. This enzyme is extremely important in the process of homologous recombination.

Exonuclease VIII is 5' to 3' dimeric protein that does not require ATP or any gaps or nicks in the strand, but requires a free 5' OH group to carry out its function.

== dnaQ ==
In Escherichia coli the dnaQ gene encodes the ε subunit of DNA polymerase III . The ε subunit is one of three core proteins of the DNA polymerase complex. It acts as a 3'→5' DNA directed proofreading exonuclease that removes incorrectly incorporated bases during replication. Similarly, in Salmonella typhimurium bacteria, the 3' to 5' editing function employed during DNA replication is also encoded by a gene, dnaQ, which specifies a 3' to 5' exonuclease subunit, one of the three separately encoded core proteins of the DNA polymerase III holoenzyme.

In contrast to E. coli and S. typhimurium, where the polymerase and editing functions are encoded by separate genes, in the bacterial species Buchnera aphidicola the DNA polymerase encoded by the DNA III (polC) gene contains both DNA polymerase and 3' to 5' exonuclease domains. An evolutionary divergence (about 0.25 to 1.2 billion years ago), appears to have been associated with the separation of the DNA polymerase gene function from the 3' to 5' exonuclease editing gene function in the lineage that led to E. coli and S. typhimurium.

== Discoveries in humans ==
The 3' to 5' human type endonuclease is known to be essential for the proper processing of histone pre-mRNA, in which U7 snRNP directs the single cleavage process. Following the removal of the downstream cleavage product (DCP) Xrn1 continues to further breakdown the product until it is completely degraded. This allows the nucleotides to be recycled. Xrn1 is linked to a co-transcriptional cleavage (CoTC) activity that acts as a precursor to develop a free 5' unprotected end, so the exonuclease can remove and degrade the downstream cleavage product (DCP). This initiates transcriptional termination because one does not want DNA or RNA strands building up in their bodies.

== Discoveries in yeast ==
CCR4-Not is a general transcription regulatory complex in budding yeast that is found to be associated with mRNA metabolism, transcription initiation, and mRNA degradation. CCR4 has been found to contain RNA and single-stranded DNA 3' to 5' exonuclease activities. Another component associated with the CCR4-Not is CAF1 protein, which has been found to contain 3' to 5' or 5' to 3' exonuclease domains in the mouse and Caenorhabditis elegans. This protein has not been found in yeast, which suggests that it is likely to have an abnormal exonuclease domain like the one seen in a metazoan. Yeast contains Rat1 and Xrn1 exonuclease. The Rat1 works just like the human type (Xrn2) and Xrn1 function in the cytoplasm is in the 5' to 3' direction to degrade RNAs (pre-5.8s and 25s rRNAs) in the absence of Rat1.

== Discoveries in Coronaviruses ==
In beta Coronaviruses, including SARS-CoV-2, a proof reading exonuclease, nsp14-ExoN, that is part of the viral genome is responsible for recombination that is implicated in novel strain emergence.
