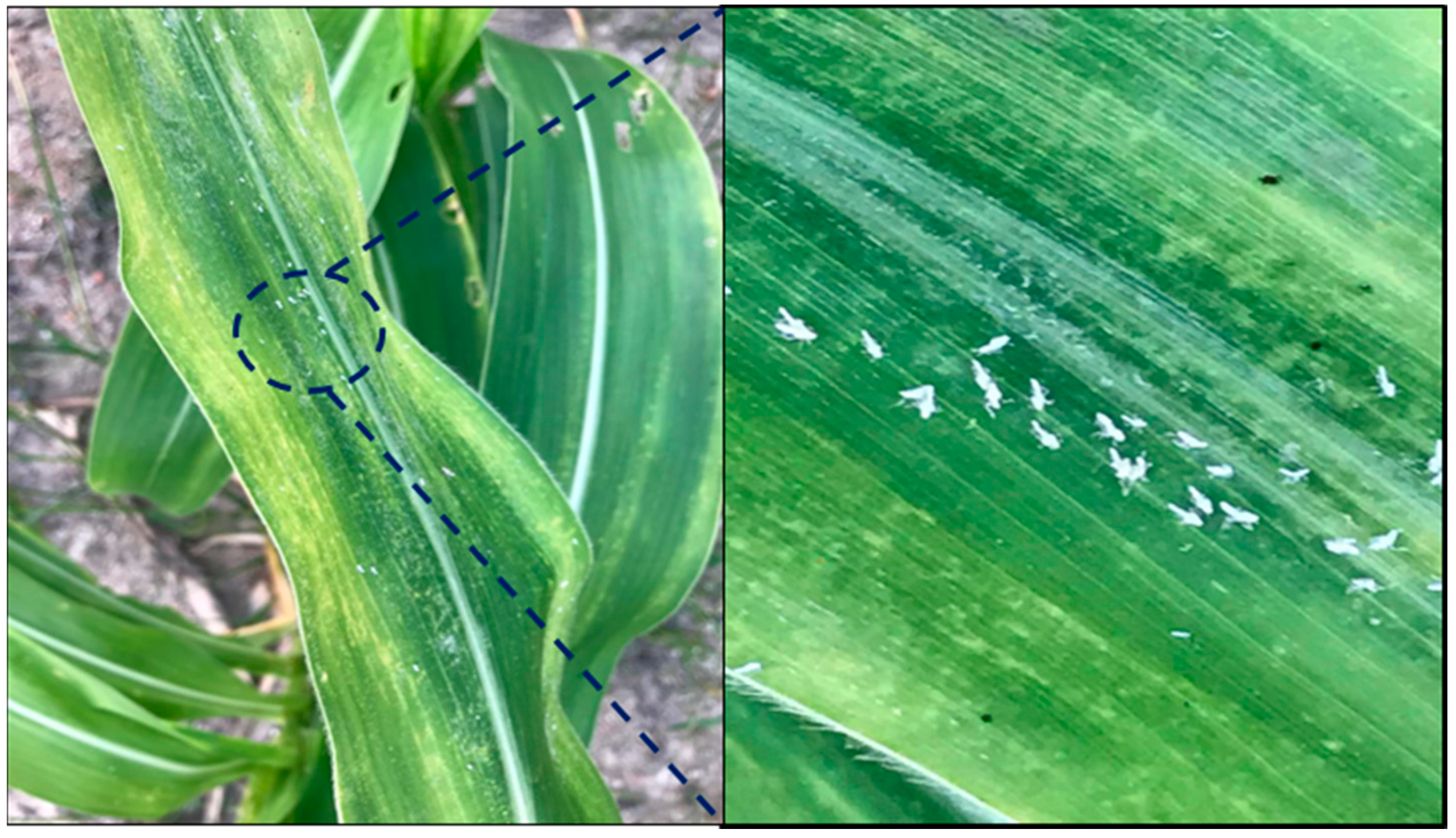
- Mosaic symptoms of MDMV on leaves and yellow streaks along veins in maize. Also the fitch, Rhopalosiphum maidis, nymph vectors on leaves.

Virus classification
- (unranked): Virus
- Realm: Riboviria
- Kingdom: Orthornavirae
- Phylum: Pisuviricota
- Class: Stelpaviricetes
- Order: Patatavirales
- Family: Potyviridae
- Genus: Potyvirus
- Species: Potyvirus zeananus

Synonyms
- MDMV-A; MDMV-D; MDMV-E; MDMV-F

= Maize dwarf mosaic virus =

Species of plant pathogenic virus

Maize dwarf mosaic virus (MDMV) is a pathogenic plant virus of the family Potyviridae. Depending on the corn plant’s growth stage, the virus can have severe implications to the corn plant’s development which can also result in economic consequences to the producer of the crop.

== Importance ==
Maize (Zea mays) is a major cereal crop; it is third behind rice and wheat in production. An average of 380 million tons are produced annually by 53 countries. Maize is the most widely grown crop ranging from tropical areas with altitudes over 3000 m to temperate areas extending as far north as the 65th latitude. MDMV is the most serious virus of sweet corn.

If corn plants are infected with MDMV, ear formation and development are slowed leading to grain yield loss. The damage from MDMV can cause the halting of ear formation and development, ultimately leading to the production of barren ears and direct yield loss. There can be losses of up to 42% on early-planted field corn. If corn is planted late MDMV can cause 75% or more loss on inbred and hybrid varieties. The number of ears per plant is reduced by MDMV infection and the fresh weight of these ears can be reduced by 30%.

== Pathogenesis ==
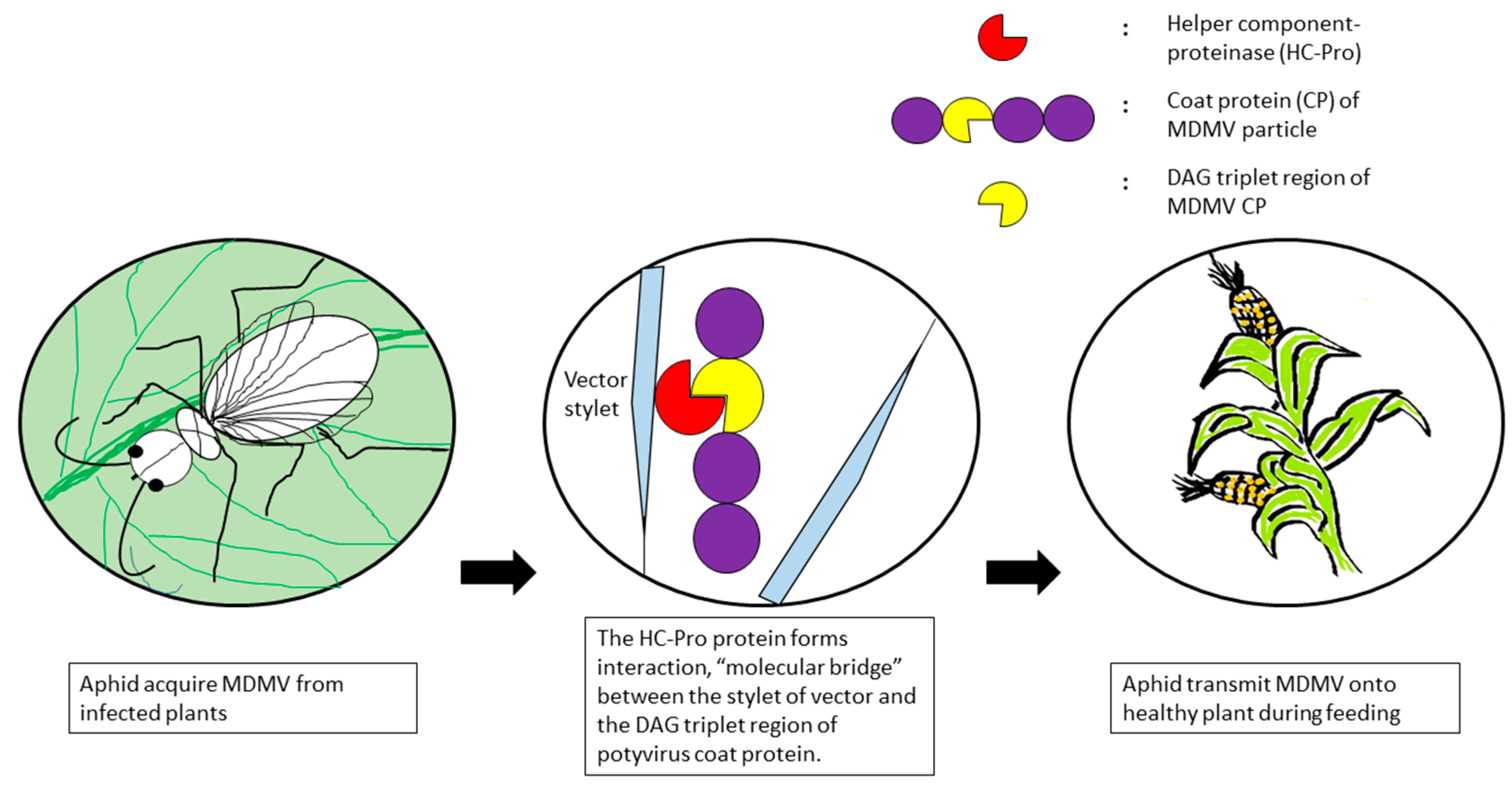
Interaction between maize dwarf mosaic virus and the aphid appendage

MDMV is caused by various strains. There are five strains A, C, D, E, and F. They differ in biological, serological, and nucleotide sequences. The vector for MDMV transmission is aphids.

There are 15 aphid species that can non-persistently transmit MDMV. The aphids mainly feed on the family Poaceae. MDMV overwinters in alternate hosts. These alternate hosts include sorghum, maize, and Johnson grass. Symptoms appear six weeks after aphids feed and transmit the virus. The aphid acquires the virus within seconds of feeding on an infected plant, either maize, Johnson grass, or sorghum. There is no latent period for transmission to new host plants. After acquiring MDMV an aphid is able to transmit the virus within 15–30 minutes. Aphids do not retain MDMV after molting.

The virus can also be spread through the seed or mechanically by leaf rubbing of Johnson grass and sorghum. MDMV in the field is not typically transmitted by seed or mechanically, it is more prevalent in greenhouses. Depending on the hybrid, most maize plants will show higher rates of disease when infected earlier in the growing stage. The pathogen itself is a flexuous, rod-shaped virus measuring 12 x 750 nm. There are antiserum kits that can confirm the viruses identity.

There is resistance to MDMV. Maize plants can have up to five resistance genes in their genetic make up. There are commercially available hybrids that provide good resistance. The major gene for resistance is called mdm1 and it is found on chromosome 6. Mdm1 was identified in Pa405, an inbred line. This chromosomal region of mdm1 is also where resistance genes to two other phtyviridae viruses are located. The resistance conferred by mdm1 can be greatly altered with genetic, environmental, and developmental factors.

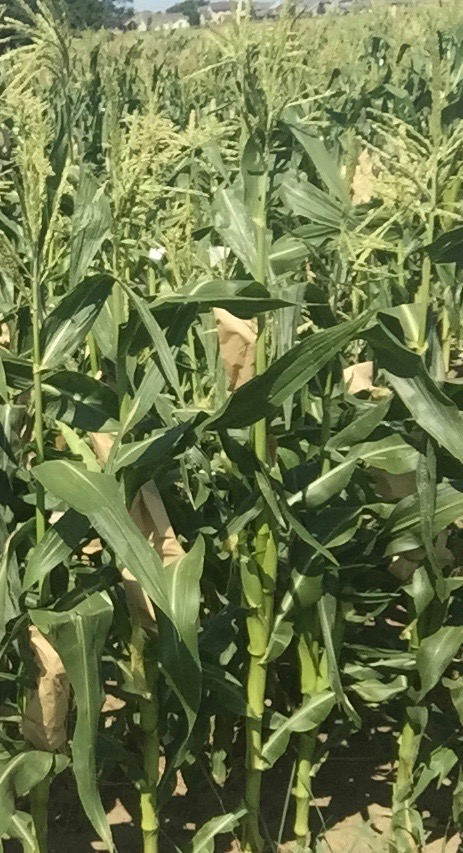
Breeding trials for MDMV resistance at University of Wisconsin West Madison Agricultural Research Station

At the University of Wisconsin–Madison there are breeding trials to help create new varieties that are resistant to MDMV.

== Environment ==
MDMV prefers warm to average temperatures. Johnson grass infected with MDMV in the surrounding environment can increase the disease on maize. MDMV is a cultivated virus that mainly occurs in the United States and Australia. MDMV does not overwinter in Minnesota and Wisconsin, which makes the source of inoculum in these northern states unclear. During infection after periods of cool night temperatures, about 60 °F, the plants may exhibit signs of the disease such as blotches or streaks of red.

== Transmission ==
Maize dwarf mosaic virus is spread by seed, by infected leaves rubbing on non-infected leaves and perhaps most commonly, via aphids (Lipps & Mills, n.d.). These aphids become carriers after they feed on plants such as Johnson grass, maize or sorghum, or other grass species that are infected with MDMV. Broadleaf plants do not become infected with MDMV (The CIMMYT Maize Program). Aphids transmit Maize Dwarf Mosaic Virus disease effectively fifteen to thirty minutes after feeding on infected plants when by spreading the virus to the susceptible plants after they have flown or are blown onto a nearby corn crop and will start to feed (“Maize Dwarf Mosaic Virus,” n.d.).

== Symptoms ==
When looking for symptoms of MDMV in corn, one must also be aware of the plant’s growth stage as symptoms may affect the plant differently at various stages. Young leaves, may experience chlorotic spotting which may eventually turn into a mosaic or mottle pattern (“Maize Dwarf Mosaic Virus,” n.d.). Later in the growing season, the mosaic pattern may bleed into a general yellowing of the leaf and eventually areas of red streaks or blotches may appear if night time temperatures are consistently around 60 degrees Fahrenheit (Lipps & Mills, n.d.). Plants affected later in their reproductive cycle may experience a slowing in ear development (“Maize Dwarf Mosaic Virus,” n.d.), while some plants may even become barren (Lipps & Mills, n.d.). It is not uncommon for plants to have shortened upper internodes or an increase in tiller number (“Maize Dwarf Mosaic Virus,” n.d.).

== Control ==
Maize dwarf mosaic virus can be managed in several ways. One way is the removal of the local population of Johnson grass as this can harbor the disease. It is best if all producers (farmers) in the area participate in this practice or the disease can remain in sporadic plant populations and be spread in the ways described above (Lipps & Mills, n.d.). Another way to help avoid MDMV is by selecting corn varieties that are tolerant of the virus and by planting corn crops earlier in the season to help seedlings avoid key aphid population times (Lipps & Mills, n.d.).
