= RNASET2 =

Protein-coding gene in the species Homo sapiens

Identifiers
- Aliases: RNASET2, RNASE6PL, bA514O12.3, ribonuclease T2
- External IDs: OMIM: 612944; MGI: 3702087; GeneCards: RNASET2
Available structures
PDB	Ortholog search: PDBe RCSB
PDB	List of PDB id codes 3T0O
Enzyme activity
EC #	BRENDA	ExPASy	KEGG	MetaCyc
4.6.1.19	↗	↗	↗	↗

Gene location (Human)
Chr.	Chromosome 6 (human)
Band	6q27	Start	166,922,113 bp
Band	6q27	End	166,957,191 bp

Gene location (Mouse)
Chr.	Chromosome 17 (mouse)
Band	17|17 A1	Start	7,238,033 bp
Band	17|17 A1	End	7,278,698 bp
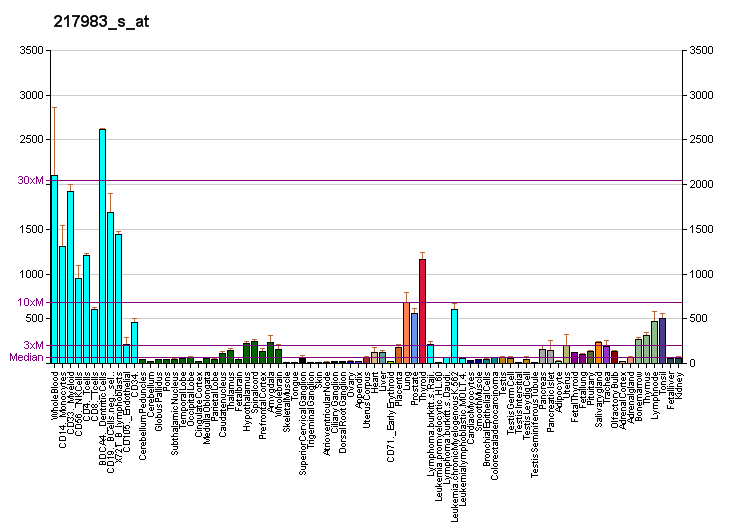

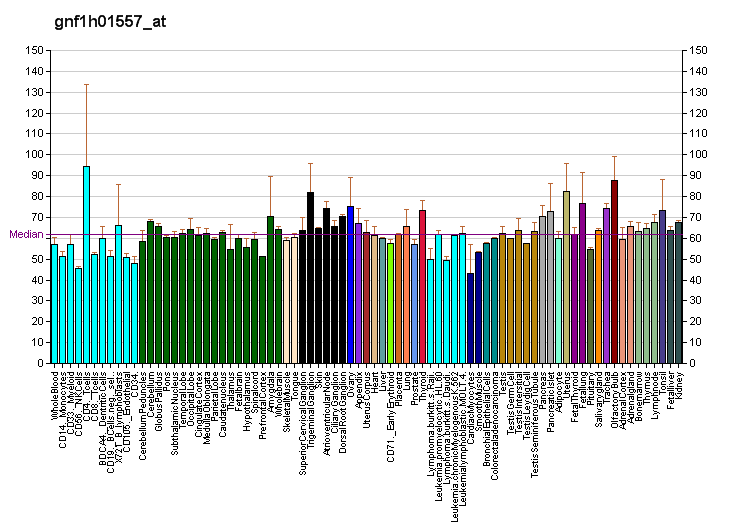

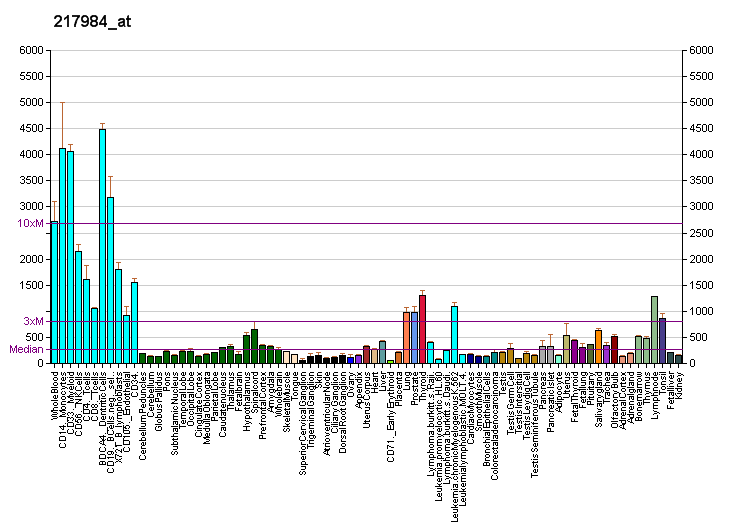
RNA expression pattern
Bgee	Human / Mouse (ortholog); Top expressed in: right uterine tube; granulocyte; blood; monocyte; spleen; parotid gland; seminal vesicula; olfactory bulb; lymph node; inferior ganglion of vagus nerve / Top expressed in: right kidney; granulocyte; muscle of thigh; lip; zygote; esophagus; genital tubercle; dentate gyrus of hippocampal formation granule cell; ventricular zone; morula; More reference expression data
BioGPS	More reference expression data
Gene ontology
Molecular function	hydrolase activity; ribonuclease T2 activity; endonuclease activity; nuclease activity; RNA binding; ribonuclease activity; endoribonuclease activity
Cellular component	lysosomal lumen; endoplasmic reticulum lumen; lysosome; endoplasmic reticulum; extracellular exosome; extracellular region; extracellular space; azurophil granule lumen
Biological process	nucleic acid phosphodiester bond hydrolysis; RNA phosphodiester bond hydrolysis, endonucleolytic; RNA catabolic process; RNA phosphodiester bond hydrolysis; neutrophil degranulation
Sources:Amigo / QuickGO
Orthologs
Databases	NCBI: entry; OMA: entry
Species	Human	Mouse
Entrez	8635	68195
Ensembl	ENSG00000026297	ENSMUSG00000094724
UniProt	O00584	Q5FWA0
RefSeq (mRNA)	NM_003730; NM_017795; NM_018726	NM_026611; NM_029204
RefSeq (protein)	NP_003721	NP_080887; NP_001077407; NP_080887
Location (UCSC)	Chr 6: 166.92 – 166.96 Mb	Chr 17: 7.24 – 7.28 Mb
PubMed search
- Wikidata
View/Edit Human	View/Edit Mouse

Ribonuclease T2 is an enzyme that in humans is encoded by the RNASET2 gene. It is a type of endoribonuclease.

This ribonuclease gene is a novel member of the Rh/T2/S-glycoprotein class of extracellular ribonucleases. It is a single copy gene that maps to 6q27, a region associated with human malignancies and chromosomal rearrangement. RNASET2 has been reported as a tumour associated antigen in anaplastic large cell lymphoma and other lymphomas.
