= XRN1 =

Identifiers
- Aliases: XRN1, SEP1, 5'-3' exoribonuclease 1, Xrn1
- External IDs: OMIM: 607994; MGI: 891964; GeneCards: XRN1

Gene location (Human)
Chr.	Chromosome 3 (human)
Band	3q23	Start	142,306,607 bp
Band	3q23	End	142,448,062 bp

Gene location (Mouse)
Chr.	Chromosome 9 (mouse)
Band	9|9 E3.3	Start	95,836,813 bp
Band	9|9 E3.3	End	95,939,856 bp
RNA expression pattern
Bgee	Human / Mouse (ortholog); Top expressed in: pancreatic epithelial cell; Achilles tendon; germinal epithelium; visceral pleura; parietal pleura; tibia; bone marrow cell; gingival epithelium; endothelial cell; palpebral conjunctiva / Top expressed in: tail of embryo; cumulus cell; Rostral migratory stream; thymus; genital tubercle; zygote; pineal gland; secondary oocyte; vas deferens; granulocyte; More reference expression data
BioGPS	n/a
Gene ontology
Molecular function	DNA binding; protein binding; nucleic acid binding; nuclease activity; exonuclease activity; hydrolase activity; RNA binding; G-quadruplex RNA binding; G-quadruplex DNA binding; 5'-3' exoribonuclease activity; telomerase RNA binding; 5'-3' exonuclease activity
Cellular component	membrane; plasma membrane; nucleus; cytoplasm; cytosol; dendrite; soma; synapse; P-body
Biological process	regulation of mRNA stability; rRNA catabolic process; nuclear mRNA surveillance; histone mRNA catabolic process; negative regulation of translation; response to testosterone; cellular response to cycloheximide; RNA phosphodiester bond hydrolysis, exonucleolytic; cellular response to puromycin; negative regulation of telomere maintenance via telomerase; nuclear-transcribed mRNA catabolic process
Sources:Amigo / QuickGO
Orthologs
Databases	NCBI: entry; OMA: entry
Species	Human	Mouse
Entrez	54464	24127
Ensembl	ENSG00000114127	ENSMUSG00000032410
UniProt	Q8IZH2	P97789
RefSeq (mRNA)	NM_001042604; NM_001282857; NM_001282859; NM_019001	NM_011916; NM_001311130
RefSeq (protein)	NP_001269786; NP_001269788; NP_061874	n/a
Location (UCSC)	Chr 3: 142.31 – 142.45 Mb	Chr 9: 95.84 – 95.94 Mb
PubMed search
- Wikidata
View/Edit Human	View/Edit Mouse

5′-3′ exoribonuclease 1 (Xrn1) is a protein that in humans is encoded by the XRN1 gene. Xrn1 hydrolyses RNA in the 5′ to 3′ direction.

== Function ==
This gene encodes a member of the 5′-3′ exonuclease family. The encoded protein may be involved in replication-dependent histone mRNA degradation, and interacts directly with the enhancer of mRNA-decapping protein 4. In addition to mRNA metabolism, a similar protein in yeast has been implicated in a variety of nuclear and cytoplasmic functions, including transcription, translation, homologous recombination, meiosis, telomere maintenance, and microtubule assembly. Mutations in this gene are associated with osteosarcoma, suggesting that the encoded protein may also play a role in bone formation. Alternative splicing results in multiple transcript variants.

== See also ==
- Xrn2
