= Ribonuclease T1 =

Class of enzymes

Ribonuclease T_{1}
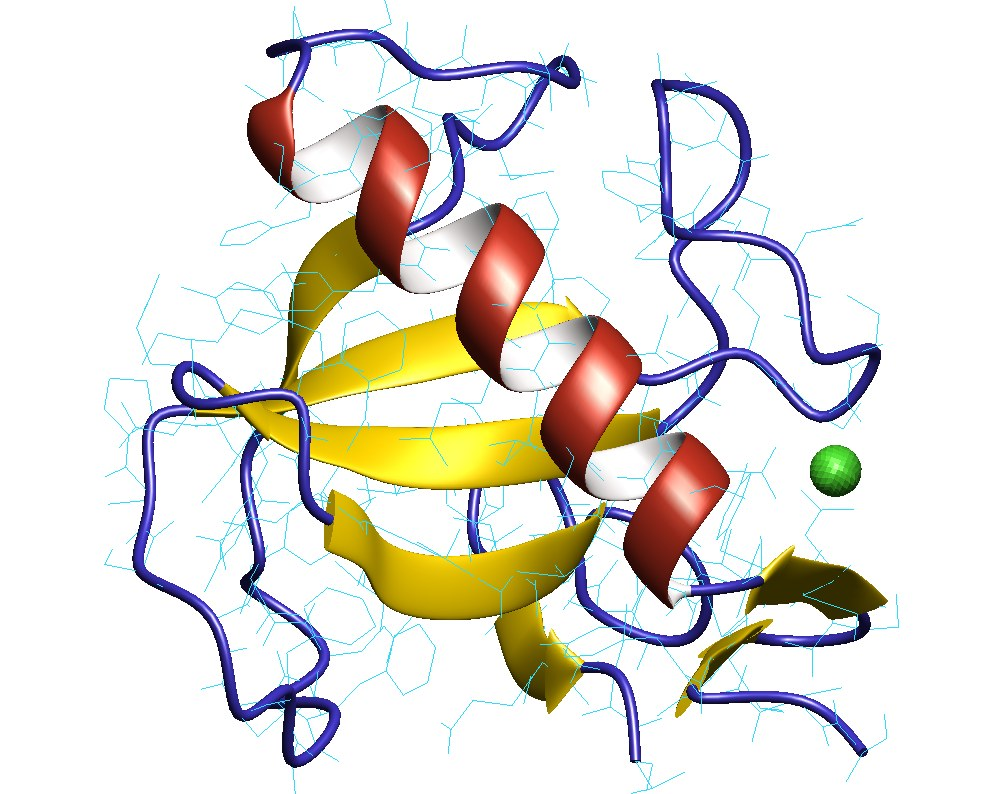

Identifiers
- EC no.: 4.6.1.24
- CAS no.: 9026-12-4

Databases
- IntEnz: IntEnz view
- BRENDA: BRENDA entry
- ExPASy: NiceZyme view
- KEGG: KEGG entry
- MetaCyc: metabolic pathway
- PRIAM: profile
- PDB structures: RCSB PDB PDBe PDBsum
- Gene Ontology: AmiGO / QuickGO
Search
- PMC: articles
- PubMed: articles
- NCBI: proteins

Ribonuclease T_{1}
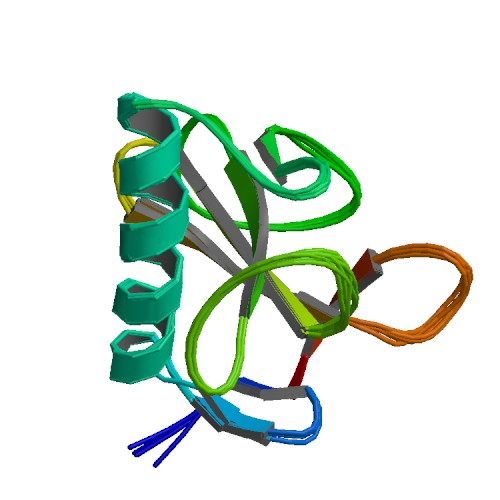
- Ribonuclease T_{1} from Aspergillus oryzae.

Identifiers
- Symbol: rntA
- PDB: 1YGW
- UniProt: P00651

Other data
- EC number: 4.6.1.24
Search for
- Structures: Swiss-model
- Domains: InterPro

Ribonuclease T_{1} (EC 4.6.1.24, guanyloribonuclease, Aspergillus oryzae ribonuclease, RNase N1, RNase N2, ribonuclease N3, ribonuclease U1, ribonuclease F1, ribonuclease Ch, ribonuclease PP1, ribonuclease SA, RNase F1, ribonuclease C2, binase, RNase Sa, guanyl-specific RNase, RNase G, RNase T_{1}, ribonuclease guaninenucleotido-2'-transferase (cyclizing), ribonuclease N3, ribonuclease N1) is a fungal endonuclease that cleaves single-stranded RNA after guanine residues, i.e., on their 3' end; the most commonly studied form of this enzyme is the version found in the mold Aspergillus oryzae. Owing to its specificity for guanine, RNase T_{1} is often used to digest denatured RNA prior to sequencing. Similar to other ribonucleases such as barnase and RNase A, ribonuclease T_{1} has been popular for folding studies.

Structurally, ribonuclease T_{1} is a small α+β protein (104 amino acids) with a four-stranded, antiparallel beta sheet covering a long alpha helix (almost five turns). RNase T_{1} has two disulfide bonds, Cys2-Cys10 and Cys6-Cys103, of which the latter contributes more to its folding stability; complete reduction of both disulfides usually unfolds the protein, although its folding can be rescued with high salt concentrations.

RNase T_{1} also has four prolines, two of which (Pro39 and Pro55) have cis isomers of their X-Pro peptide bonds. Nonnative isomers of these prolines can retard conformational folding dramatically, folding on a characteristic time scale of 7,000 seconds (almost two hours) at 10 °C and pH 5.
