= Cleavage and polyadenylation specificity factor =

Cleavage and polyadenylation specificity factor (CPSF) is involved in the cleavage of the 3' signaling region from a newly synthesized pre-messenger RNA (pre-mRNA) molecule in the process of gene transcription. In eukaryotes, messenger RNA precursors (pre-mRNA) are transcribed in the nucleus from DNA by the enzyme, RNA polymerase II. The pre-mRNA must undergo post-transcriptional modifications, forming mature RNA (mRNA), before they can be transported into the cytoplasm for translation into proteins. The post-transcriptional modifications are: the addition of a 5' m7G cap, splicing of intronic sequences, and 3' cleavage and polyadenylation.

According to Schönemann et al., "CPSF recognizes the polyadenylation signal (PAS), providing sequence specificity in pre-mRNA cleavage and polyadenylation, and catalyzes pre-mRNA cleavage." It is required to induce RNA polymerase pausing once it recognizes a functional PAS. It is the first protein to bind to the signaling region near the cleavage site of the pre-mRNA, to which the poly(A) tail will be added by polynucleotide adenylyltransferase. The 10-30 nucleotide upstream signaling region of the cleavage site, polyadenylation signal (PAS), has the canonical nucleotide sequence AAUAAA, which is highly conserved across the vast majority of pre-mRNAs. The AAUAAA region is usually defined by a cytosine/adenine (CA) dinucleotide, which is the preferred sequence, that is 5' to the site of the endonucleolytic cleavage. A second downstream signaling region, located approximately 40 nucleotides downstream from the cleavage site on the portion of the pre-mRNA that is cleaved before polyadenylation, consists of a U/GU-rich region required for efficient processing. This downstream fragment is degraded. The mature RNA are transported into the cytoplasm, where they are translated into proteins.

== Protein Structure & Interactions ==
In mammals, CPSF is a protein complex, consisting of six subunits: CPSF-160 (CPSF1), CPSF-100 (CPSF2), CPSF-73 (CPSF3), and CPSF-30 (CPSF4) kDa subunits, WDR33 and Fip1 (FIP1L1).

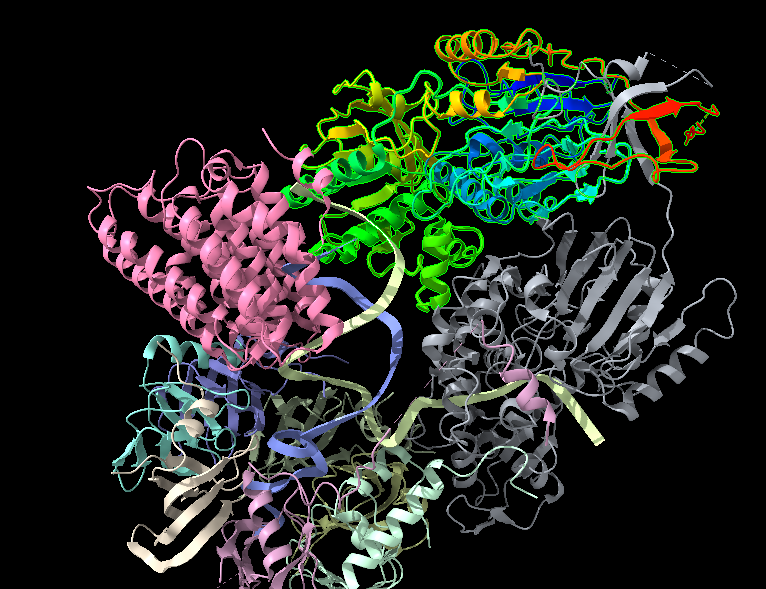
Cleavage and polyadenylation specificity factor quaternary complex

The subunits form two components: mammalian polyadenylation specificity factors (mPSF) and mammalian cleavage factor (mCF). The mPSF is made up of CPSF-160, WDR33, CPSF-30, and Fip1. It is necessary for PAS recognition and polyadenylation. The mCF is made up of CPSF-73, CPSF-100, and symplekin. It catalyzes the cleavage reaction by recognizing the histone mRNA 3' processing site.

CPSF-73 is a zinc-dependent hydrolase which cleaves the mRNA precursor between a CA dinucleotide just downstream the polyadenylation signal sequence AAUAAA.

CPSF-100 contributes to the endonuclease activity of CPSF-73.

CPSF-160 (160 kDa) is the largest subunit of CPSF and directly binds to the AAUAAA polyadenylation signal. 160 kDa has three β-propeller domains and a C-terminal domain.

CPSF-30 (30 kDa) has five Cys-Cys-Cys-His (CCCH) zinc-finger motifs near the N terminus and a CCCH zinc knuckle at the C terminus. Two isoforms of CPSF-30 exist and can be found in CPSF complexes. The RNA binding activity of CPSF-30 is mediated by its zinc-fingers 2 and 3. WD repeat domain 33 (146 kDa) has a WD40 domain near the N terminus. The WD40 domain interacts with RNA. WDR33 and CPSF-30 recognize the polyadenylation signal (PAS) in pre-mRNA, which aids in defining the position of RNA cleavage. CPSF-30 recognizes the AU-rich hexamer region by a cooperative, metal-dependent binding mechanism.

Although CPSF-160 is the largest subunit of CPSF, a study conducted by Schönemann et al., debate that WDR33 is responsible for recognizing the PAS and not CPSF-160 as previously believed. The study concluded that the reason that CPSF-160 was believed to be responsible for recognizing the PAS was due to the fact that the WDR33 subunit had not been discovered at the time of the claim.

Fip1 binds to U-rich RNAs by its arginine-rich C-terminus. It binds to RNA sequences upstream of the AAUAAA hexamer region in vitro. Fip1 and CPSF-160 recruit poly(A) polymerase (PAP) to the 3' processing site. PAP is stimulated by Poly(A) binding protein nuclear one to add the poly(A) tail, a non-templated adenosine residues, at the cleavage site.

Only CPSF-160, CPSF-30, Fip1, and WDR33 are necessary and sufficient to form an active CPSF subcomplex in AAUAAA-dependent polyadenylation. CPSF-73 and CPSF-100 are disposable.

CPSF recruits proteins to the 3' region. Identified proteins that are coordinated by CPSF activity include: cleavage stimulatory factor and the two poorly understood cleavage factors. The binding of the polynucleotide adenylyltransferase responsible for actually synthesizing the tail is a necessary prerequisite for cleavage, thus ensuring that cleavage and polyadenylation are tightly coupled processes.

== Genes ==
- CPSF1, CPSF2, CPSF3, CPSF4, NUDT21, CPSF6, CPSF7, FIP1L1

== Alternative Polyadenylation (APA) ==
Alternative polyadenylation (APA) is a regulatory mechanism that forms multiple 3' end on mRNA.

APA isoforms from the same gene can encode different proteins and/or contain different 3' untranslated regions (UTRs). Deregulation of APA has been associated with a number of human diseases. Since longer UTRs have more binding sites for microRNAs and/or RNA-binding proteins in comparison to shorter UTRs, APA require different stability, translation efficiency, and/or intracellular localization.

Mammalian PASs have a number of key cis elements.

- A(A/U)AAA hexamer
- U/GU-rich downstream element (DSE)
- U-rich upstream auxiliary elements (USEs)
- Upstream sequences conforming to the consensus UGUA

PAS sequences are variable, and many PASs lack one or more cis elements. PAS recognition is accomplished by protein-RNA interactions.

CPSF synergistically binds to the AAUAAA hexamer and CstF synergistically binds to the downstream element (DSE). The CFI complex binds to the UGUA motifs. CPSF, CstF, and CFI bind directly to RNA. They also recruit other proteins such as CFII, symplekin, and the poly(A) polymerase (PAP) to assemble the mRNA 3' processing complex, also known as the cleavage and polyadenylation complex. The assembly of these factors are facilitated by the C-terminal domain (CTD) of the RNA polymerase II (RNAP II) large subunit. The CTD provides a landing pad for mRNA processing factors.

== Other Protein Complexes in the Cleavage and Polyadenylation Complex ==
Symplekin (SYMPK) is a scaffolding protein that mediates the interaction between CPSF and CstF.

In mammalian CPSF, both cleavage factor I (CFI_{m}) and cleavage and polyadenylation specificity factor (CPSF) are required for cleavage and polyadenylation whereas cleavage stimulation factor (CstF) is only essential for the cleavage step. CPSF and CstF travel along with RNA polymerase II (RNAP II) during nascent gene transcription in search of the PAS.

Cleavage factor I (CFI_{m}) is made of 25 (CPSF5), 59 (CPSF7), and 68 (CPSF6) kDa proteins. Cleavage factor II (CFII_{m}) is made of Pcf11, Clp1, and cleavage stimulation factor (CstF). CFII_{m} binds to the RNAP II C-terminal domain and other CpA factors.

Cleavage stimulation factor (CstF) has three subunits: CstF77 (CstF3), CstF50 (CstF1), and CstF64 (CstF2 and CstF2T). CstF recognizes the PAS that is 20 nucleotides downstream the signaling region of the cleavage site, which is a GU-rich sequence motif followed by U-rich sequences. CstF contributes to the selection of the cleavage site, as well as alternative polyadenylation.

== Coupled Processes ==
Coupling of RNA polymerase II (pol II) transcription can influence processing reactions in three ways.

1. localization
  - positions mRNA processing factors at the elongation complex, which raises their local concentration in the vicinity of the nascent transcript
2. kinetic coupling
  - the rate of transcript can have profound effects on RNA folding and the assembly of RNA-protein complexes
3. allosteric
  - contact between the pol II elongation complex and mRNA processing factors can allosterically inhibit or activate mRNA processing factors
