= Polynucleotide adenylyltransferase =

Class of enzymes

polynucleotide adenylyltransferase

Identifiers
- EC no.: 2.7.7.19
- CAS no.: 9026-30-6

Databases
- IntEnz: IntEnz view
- BRENDA: BRENDA entry
- ExPASy: NiceZyme view
- KEGG: KEGG entry
- MetaCyc: metabolic pathway
- PRIAM: profile
- PDB structures: RCSB PDB PDBe PDBsum
- Gene Ontology: AmiGO / QuickGO
Search
- PMC: articles
- PubMed: articles
- NCBI: proteins

In enzymology, a polynucleotide adenylyltransferase (EC 2.7.7.19) is an enzyme that catalyzes the chemical reaction

ATP + RNA-3'OH $\rightleftharpoons$ pyrophosphate + RNApA-3'OH

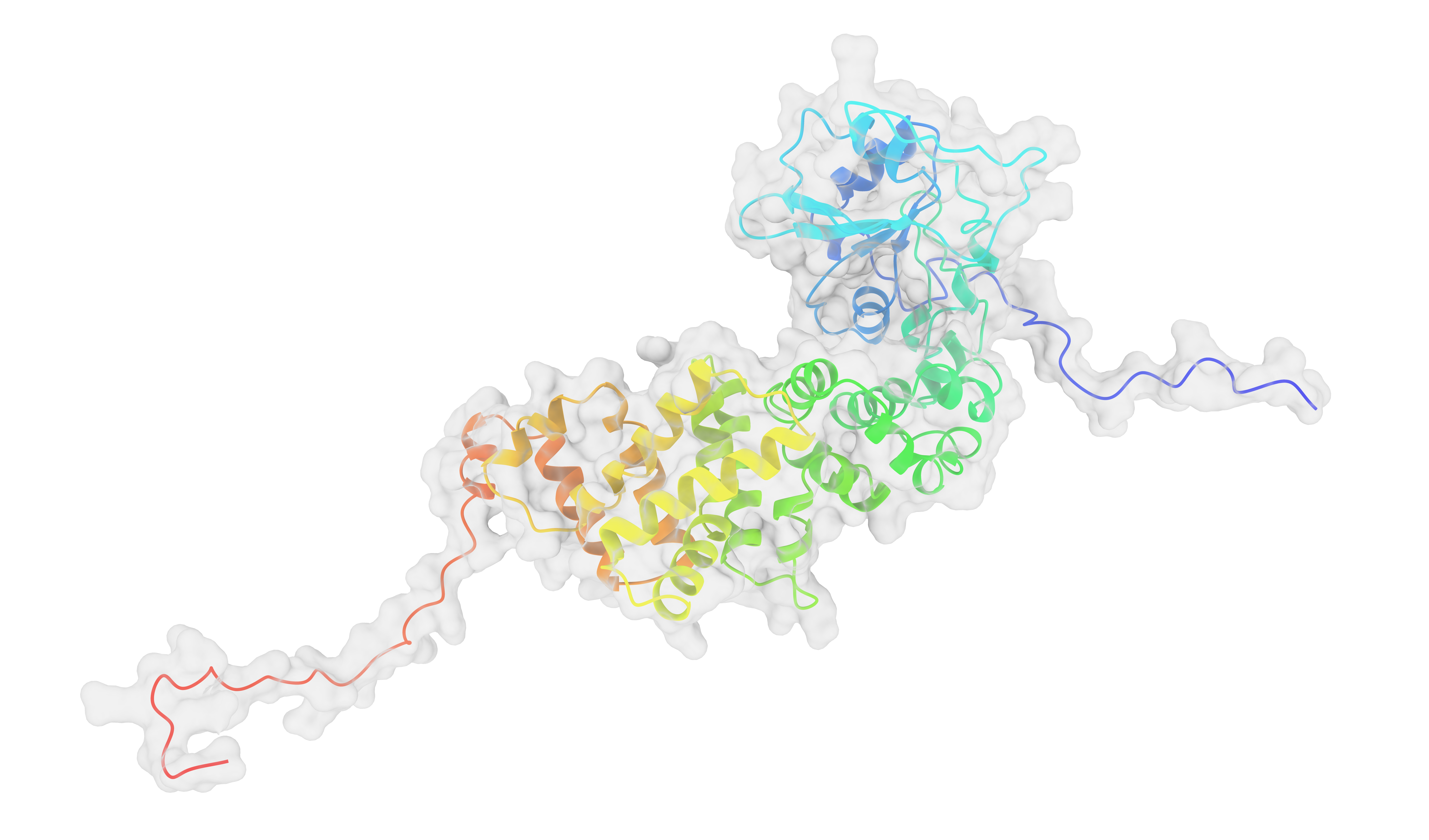
Structure of E. coli poly(A) polymerase based on PDB 3AQN. Missing segments were reconstructed using MODELLER. Rendered using ChimeraX.

Thus, the two substrates of this enzyme are ATP and RNA, whereas its two products are pyrophosphate and RNA with an extra adenosine nucleotide at its 3' end.

Human genes with this activity include TUT1, MTPAP, PAPOLA, PAPOLB, PAPOLG, TENT2, TENT4A, TENT4B, TENT5C, TENT5D.

== Function ==
This enzyme is responsible for the addition of the 3' polyadenine tail to a newly synthesized pre-messenger RNA (pre-mRNA) molecule during the process of gene transcription. The protein is the final addition to a large protein complex that also contains smaller assemblies known as the cleavage and polyadenylation specificity factor (CPSF) and cleavage stimulatory factor (CtSF) and its binding is a necessary prerequisite to the cleavage of the 3' end of the pre-mRNA. After cleavage of the 3' signaling region that directs the assembly of the complex, polyadenylate polymerase (PAP) adds the polyadenine tail to the new 3' end.

The rate at which PAP adds adenine nucleotides is dependent on the presence of another regulatory protein, PABPII (poly-adenine binding protein II). The first few nucleotides added by PAP are added very slowly, but the short polyadenine tail is then bound by PABPII, which accelerates the rate of adenine addition by PAP. The final tail is about 200-250 adenine nucleotides long in mammals.

PAP is phosphorylated by mitosis-promoting factor, a key regulator of the cell cycle. High phosphorylation levels decrease PAP activity.

== Structural studies ==
As of late 2007, 27 structures have been solved for this class of enzymes, with PDB accession codes 1AV6, 1B42, 1BKY, 1EAM, 1EQA, 1F5A, 1FA0, 1JSZ, 1JTE, 1JTF, 1P39, 1Q78, 1Q79, 1V39, 1VFG, 1VP3, 1VP9, 1VPT, 2GA9, 2GAF, 2HHP, 2O1P, 2Q66, 2VP3, 3MAG, 3MCT, and 4DCG.
