= UIMC1 =

Protein-coding gene in the species Homo sapiens

Identifiers
- Aliases: UIMC1, RAP80, X2HRIP110, ubiquitin interaction motif containing 1
- External IDs: OMIM: 609433; MGI: 103185; GeneCards: UIMC1
Available structures
PDB	Ortholog search: PDBe RCSB
PDB	List of PDB id codes 2MKF, 2MKG, 2RR9, 2N9E

Gene location (Human)
Chr.	Chromosome 5 (human)
Band	5q35.2	Start	176,905,005 bp
Band	5q35.2	End	177,022,633 bp

Gene location (Mouse)
Chr.	Chromosome 13 (mouse)
Band	13|13 B1	Start	55,175,693 bp
Band	13|13 B1	End	55,248,113 bp
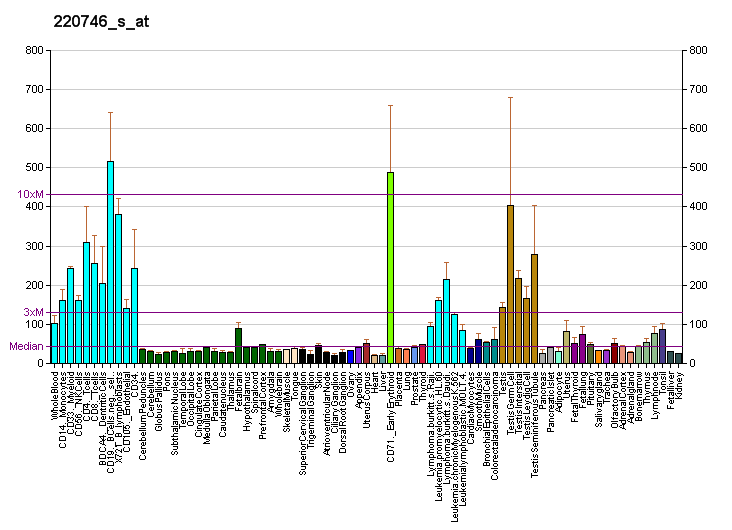
RNA expression pattern
Bgee	Human / Mouse (ortholog); Top expressed in: left testis; right testis; sural nerve; Achilles tendon; monocyte; left ovary; granulocyte; right ovary; epithelium of colon; body of uterus / Top expressed in: dentate gyrus of hippocampal formation granule cell; epiblast; tunica media of zone of aorta; Paneth cell; gastrula; mesenteric lymph nodes; body of femur; spleen; hair follicle; bone marrow; More reference expression data
BioGPS	More reference expression data
Gene ontology
Molecular function	histone binding; K63-linked polyubiquitin modification-dependent protein binding; protein binding
Cellular component	BRCA1-A complex; nucleus; nucleoplasm; nuclear body
Biological process	response to ionizing radiation; positive regulation of DNA repair; histone H2A K63-linked deubiquitination; negative regulation of transcription, DNA-templated; double-strand break repair via nonhomologous end joining; regulation of transcription, DNA-templated; transcription, DNA-templated; cellular response to DNA damage stimulus; double-strand break repair; DNA repair; protein deubiquitination; mitotic G2 DNA damage checkpoint signaling; chromatin organization
Sources:Amigo / QuickGO
Orthologs
Databases	NCBI: entry; OMA: entry
Species	Human	Mouse
Entrez	51720	20184
Ensembl	ENSG00000087206	ENSMUSG00000025878
UniProt	Q96RL1	Q5U5Q9
RefSeq (mRNA)	NM_001199297; NM_001199298; NM_016290; NM_001317961	NM_001293660; NM_011307; NM_001359757; NM_001359758
RefSeq (protein)	NP_001186226; NP_001186227; NP_001304890; NP_057374	NP_001280589; NP_035437; NP_001346686; NP_001346687
Location (UCSC)	Chr 5: 176.91 – 177.02 Mb	Chr 13: 55.18 – 55.25 Mb
PubMed search
- Wikidata
View/Edit Human	View/Edit Mouse

BRCA1-A complex subunit RAP80 is a protein that in humans is encoded by the UIMC1 gene.

== Repair of DNA damage ==
RAP80, the protein product of the UIMC1 gene, is a core component of the deubiquitin complex BRCA1-A. Other core components of the BRCA1-A complex are the BRCC36 protein (BRCC3 gene), BRE protein (BRE (gene)), and MERIT40 protein (BABAM1 gene).

BRCA1, as distinct from BRCA1-A, is employed in the repair of chromosomal damage with an important role in the error-free homologous recombinational (HR) repair of DNA double-strand breaks. Sequestration of BRCA1 away from the DNA damage site suppresses homologous recombination and redirects the cell in the direction of repair by the process of non-homologous end joining (NHEJ). The role of BRCA1-A complex appears to be to bind BRCA1 with high affinity and withdraw it away from the site of DNA damage to the periphery where it remains sequestered, thus promoting NHEJ in preference to HR.
