= CSTF3 =

Protein-coding gene in the species Homo sapiens

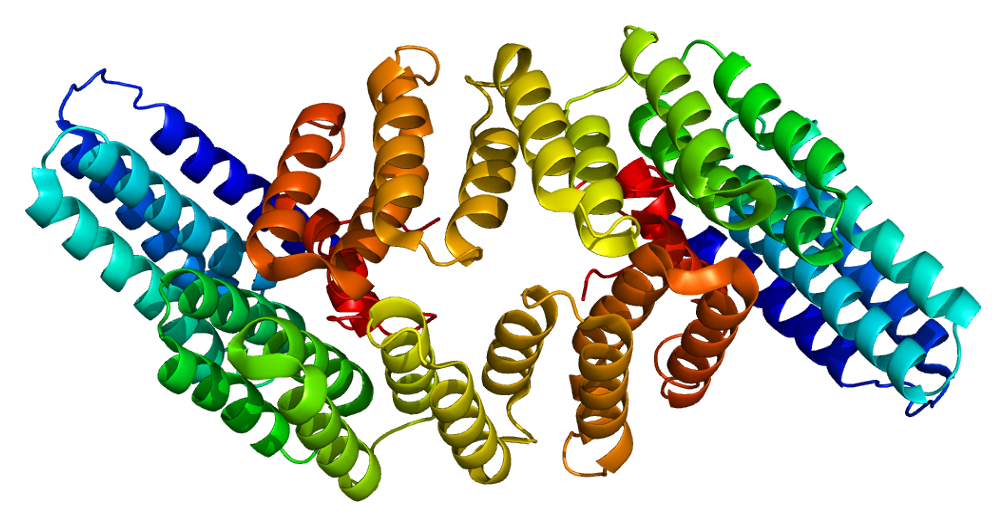
Available structures
PDB	Ortholog search: PDBe RCSB
PDB	List of PDB id codes 2OND, 2OOE

Identifiers
- Aliases: CSTF3, CSTF-77, cleavage stimulation factor subunit 3
- External IDs: OMIM: 600367; MGI: 1351825; HomoloGene: 1014; GeneCards: CSTF3; OMA:CSTF3 - orthologs

Gene location (Human)
Chr.	Chromosome 11 (human)
Band	11p13	Start	33,077,188 bp
Band	11p13	End	33,162,371 bp

Gene location (Mouse)
Chr.	Chromosome 2 (mouse)
Band	2 E2|2 54.84 cM	Start	104,420,868 bp
Band	2 E2|2 54.84 cM	End	104,495,774 bp
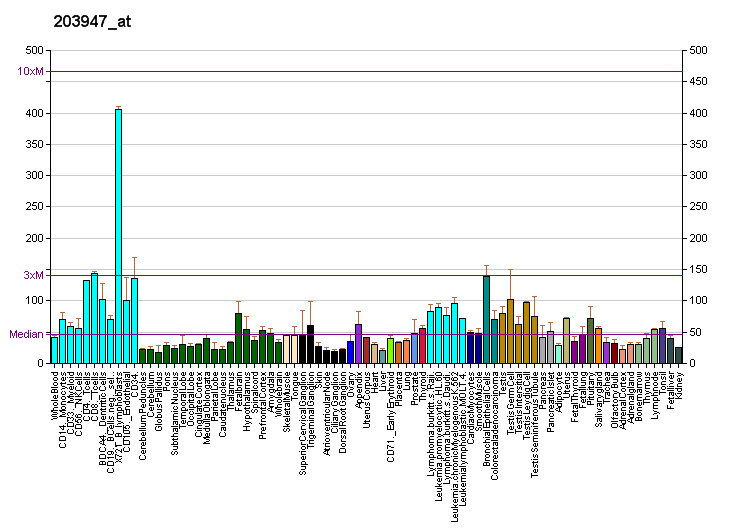
RNA expression pattern
Bgee	Human / Mouse (ortholog); Top expressed in: anterior pituitary; tendon of biceps brachii; ganglionic eminence; corpus epididymis; ventricular zone; right hemisphere of cerebellum; right uterine tube; buccal mucosa cell; right testis; sperm / Top expressed in: primitive streak; neural layer of retina; superior cervical ganglion; otic placode; abdominal wall; atrioventricular junction; ganglionic eminence; epiblast; endocardial cushion; ventricular zone; More reference expression data
BioGPS	More reference expression data
Gene ontology
Molecular function	protein binding; mRNA binding; RNA binding
Cellular component	nucleus; nucleoplasm
Biological process	mRNA splicing, via spliceosome; termination of RNA polymerase II transcription; mRNA polyadenylation; mRNA cleavage; RNA processing; mRNA processing; mRNA 3'-end processing; RNA 3'-end processing
Sources:Amigo / QuickGO
Orthologs
Species	Human	Mouse
Entrez	1479	228410
Ensembl	ENSG00000176102	ENSMUSG00000027176
UniProt	Q12996	Q99LI7
RefSeq (mRNA)	NM_001033505; NM_001033506; NM_001326	NM_001037326; NM_145529; NM_177253
RefSeq (protein)	NP_001028677; NP_001028678; NP_001317	NP_001032403; NP_663504; NP_796227
Location (UCSC)	Chr 11: 33.08 – 33.16 Mb	Chr 2: 104.42 – 104.5 Mb
PubMed search
- Wikidata
View/Edit Human	View/Edit Mouse

Cleavage stimulation factor 77 kDa subunit is a protein that in humans is encoded by the CSTF3 gene.

The protein encoded by this gene is one of three (including CSTF1 and CSTF2) cleavage stimulation factors that combine to form the cleavage stimulation factor complex (CSTF). This complex is involved in the polyadenylation and 3' end cleavage of pre-mRNAs. The encoded protein functions as a homodimer and interacts directly with both CSTF1 and CSTF2 in the CSTF complex. Alternative splicing results in multiple transcript variants encoding different isoforms.

== Interactions ==
CSTF3 has been shown to interact with CSTF2.
