= PAPOLG =

Protein-coding gene in the species Homo sapiens

Available structures
PDB	Ortholog search: PDBe RCSB
PDB	List of PDB id codes 4LT6

Identifiers
- Aliases: PAPOLG, poly(A) polymerase gamma
- External IDs: OMIM: 616865; MGI: 2442119; HomoloGene: 56959; GeneCards: PAPOLG; OMA:PAPOLG - orthologs

Gene location (Human)
Chr.	Chromosome 2 (human)
Band	2p16.1	Start	60,756,253 bp
Band	2p16.1	End	60,802,086 bp

Gene location (Mouse)
Chr.	Chromosome 11 (mouse)
Band	11|11 A3.2	Start	23,812,646 bp
Band	11|11 A3.2	End	23,845,253 bp
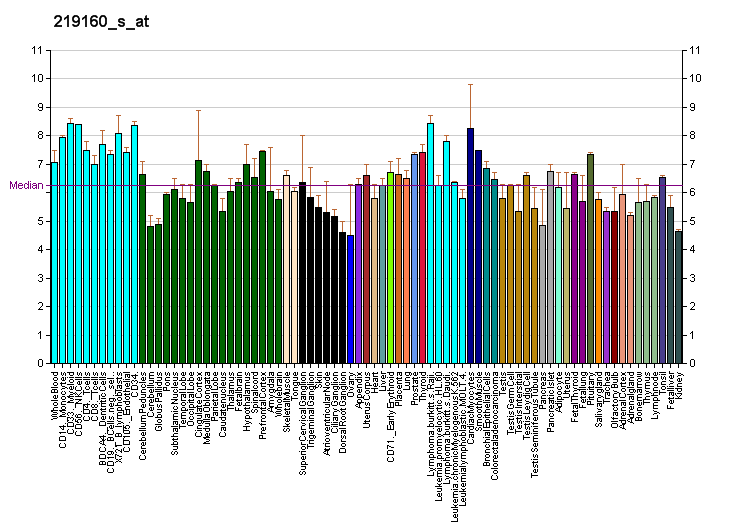
RNA expression pattern
Bgee	Human / Mouse (ortholog); Top expressed in: endothelial cell; testicle; Brodmann area 23; gonad; ganglionic eminence; buccal mucosa cell; ventricular zone; primary visual cortex; tibia; thyroid gland / Top expressed in: secondary oocyte; zygote; atrioventricular valve; primary oocyte; endocardial cushion; genital tubercle; medullary collecting duct; mandibular prominence; maxillary prominence; pineal gland; More reference expression data
BioGPS	More reference expression data
Gene ontology
Molecular function	transferase activity; nucleotide binding; nucleotidyltransferase activity; polynucleotide adenylyltransferase activity; ATP binding; metal ion binding; RNA binding
Cellular component	membrane; nucleus; nucleoplasm; cytosol; nuclear body
Biological process	mRNA polyadenylation; mRNA processing; RNA polyadenylation; RNA 3'-end processing
Sources:Amigo / QuickGO
Orthologs
Species	Human	Mouse
Entrez	64895	216578
Ensembl	ENSG00000115421	ENSMUSG00000020273
UniProt	Q9BWT3	Q6PCL9
RefSeq (mRNA)	NM_022894	NM_172555
RefSeq (protein)	NP_075045	NP_766143
Location (UCSC)	Chr 2: 60.76 – 60.8 Mb	Chr 11: 23.81 – 23.85 Mb
PubMed search
- Wikidata
View/Edit Human	View/Edit Mouse

Poly(A) polymerase gamma is an enzyme that in humans is encoded by the PAPOLG gene.

This gene encodes a member of the poly(A) polymerase family which catalyzes template-independent extension of the 3' end of a DNA/RNA strand. This enzyme shares 60% identity to the well characterized poly(A) polymerase II (PAPII) at the amino acid level. These two enzymes have similar organization of structural and functional domains. This enzyme is exclusively localized in the nucleus and exhibits both nonspecific and CPSF (cleavage and polyadenylation specificity factor)/AAUAAA-dependent polyadenylation activity. This gene is located on chromosome 2 in contrast to the PAPII gene, which is located on chromosome 14.
