= BABAM1 =

Protein-coding gene in the species Homo sapiens

Identifiers
- Aliases: BABAM1, C19orf62, MERIT40, NBA1, HSPC142, BRISC and BRCA1 A complex member 1
- External IDs: OMIM: 612766; MGI: 1915501; GeneCards: BABAM1

Gene location (Human)
Chr.	Chromosome 19 (human)
Band	19p13.11	Start	17,267,376 bp
Band	19p13.11	End	17,281,249 bp

Gene location (Mouse)
Chr.	Chromosome 8 (mouse)
Band	8 B3.3|8	Start	71,849,505 bp
Band	8 B3.3|8	End	71,857,263 bp
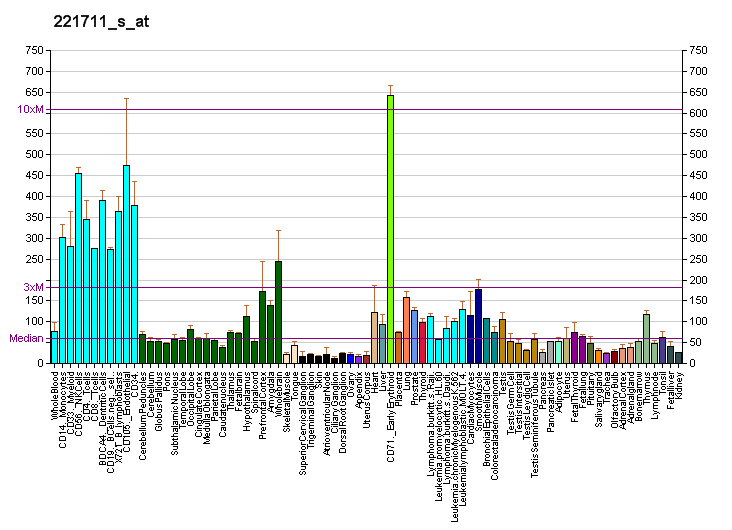
RNA expression pattern
Bgee	Human / Mouse (ortholog); Top expressed in: prefrontal cortex; right frontal lobe; anterior cingulate cortex; granulocyte; cerebellar hemisphere; right hemisphere of cerebellum; apex of heart; muscle of thigh; gastrocnemius muscle; Brodmann area 9 / Top expressed in: neural layer of retina; right kidney; muscle of thigh; temporal muscle; dentate gyrus of hippocampal formation granule cell; triceps brachii muscle; ventricular zone; sternocleidomastoid muscle; yolk sac; ankle; More reference expression data
BioGPS	More reference expression data
Gene ontology
Molecular function	protein binding
Cellular component	cytoplasm; BRCA1-A complex; nucleus; BRISC complex; nucleoplasm; cytosol; nuclear body
Biological process	response to ionizing radiation; cell cycle; positive regulation of DNA repair; protein K63-linked deubiquitination; double-strand break repair via nonhomologous end joining; cellular response to DNA damage stimulus; cell division; double-strand break repair; DNA repair; protein deubiquitination; mitotic G2 DNA damage checkpoint signaling; chromatin organization; hematopoietic stem cell proliferation
Sources:Amigo / QuickGO
Orthologs
Databases	NCBI: entry; OMA: entry
Species	Human	Mouse
Entrez	29086	68251
Ensembl	ENSG00000105393	ENSMUSG00000031820
UniProt	Q9NWV8	Q3UI43
RefSeq (mRNA)	NM_014173; NM_001033549; NM_001288756; NM_001288757	NM_026636
RefSeq (protein)	NP_001028721; NP_001275685; NP_001275686; NP_054892	NP_080912
Location (UCSC)	Chr 19: 17.27 – 17.28 Mb	Chr 8: 71.85 – 71.86 Mb
PubMed search
- Wikidata
View/Edit Human	View/Edit Mouse

BRCA1-A complex subunit MERIT40 is a protein that in humans is encoded by the BABAM1 gene.

== Interactions ==
BABAM1 has been shown to interact with BRE.

== Repair of DNA damage ==
MERIT40, the protein product of the BABAM1 gene, is a core component of the deubiquitin complex BRCA1-A. Other core components of the BRCA1-A complex are the BRCC36 protein (BRCC3 gene), BRE protein (BRE (gene)), and RAP80 protein (UIMC1 gene). MERIT40 protein binds ubiquitin with high affinity.

BRCA1, as distinct from BRCA1-A, is employed in the repair of chromosomal damage with an important role in the error-free homologous recombinational (HR) repair of DNA double-strand breaks. Sequestration of BRCA1 away from the DNA damage site suppresses homologous recombination and redirects the cell in the direction of repair by the process of non-homologous end joining (NHEJ). The role of BRCA1-A appears to be to bind BRCA1 with high affinity and withdraw it away from the site of DNA damage to the periphery where it remains sequestered, thus promoting NHEJ in preference to HR.
