= Partial cleavage stimulation factor domain =

Identifiers
- Symbol: partial_CstF
- Pfam: PF15861
Available protein structures:
- Pfam: structures / ECOD
- PDB: RCSB PDB; PDBe; PDBj
- PDBsum: structure summary

The partial cleavage stimulation factor domain, or partial CstF domain, is a protein domain that occurs in proteins from apicomplexan parasites.

Currently (as of 2012), little is known about the function of this domain. However, it is homologous to the amino-terminal part of the cleavage stimulation factor, which is thought to be involved with mRNA maturation in mammals. Proteins with this domain have been detected in the malaria parasite Plasmodium falciparum nucleus.
