= SUB1 =

Protein-coding gene in the species Homo sapiens

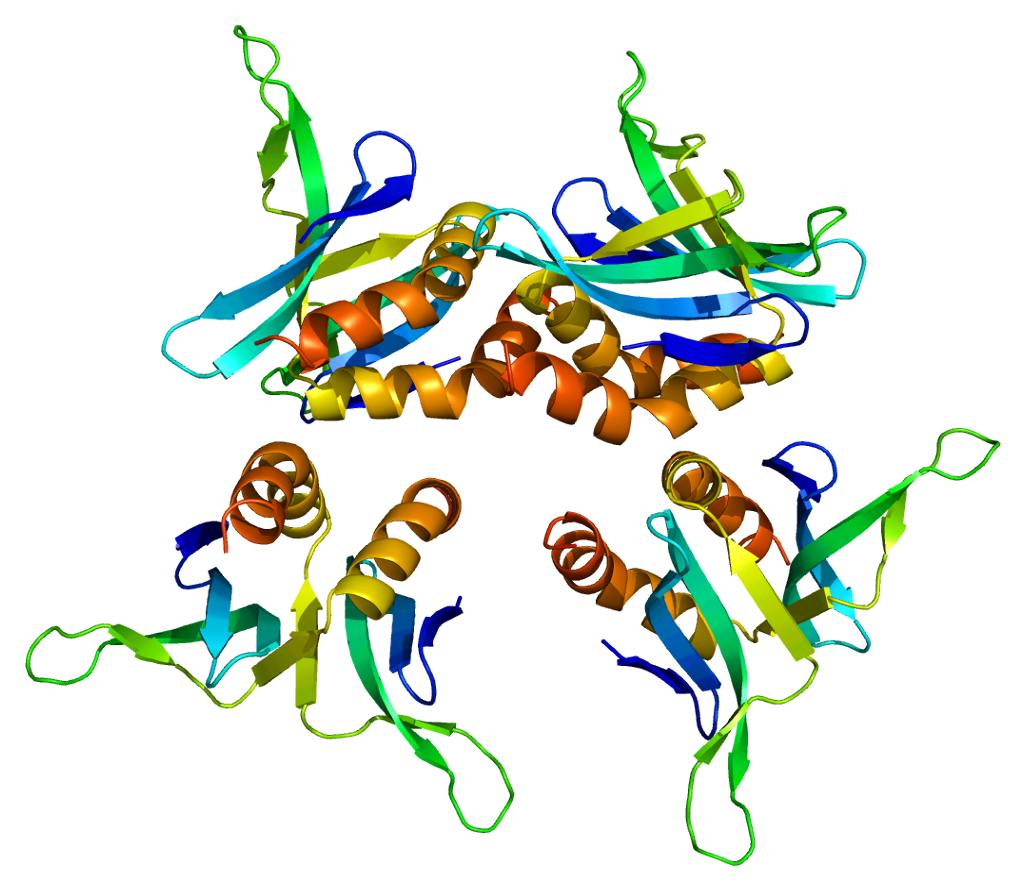

Identifiers
- Aliases: SUB1, P15, PC4, p14, SUB1 homolog, transcriptional regulator, SUB1 regulator of transcription
- External IDs: OMIM: 600503; MGI: 104811; GeneCards: SUB1
Available structures
PDB	Ortholog search: PDBe RCSB
PDB	List of PDB id codes 1PCF, 2C62, 2PHE, 4USG

Gene location (Human)
Chr.	Chromosome 5 (human)
Band	5p13.3	Start	32,531,633 bp
Band	5p13.3	End	32,604,079 bp

Gene location (Mouse)
Chr.	Chromosome 15 (mouse)
Band	15|15 A1	Start	11,981,425 bp
Band	15|15 A1	End	11,997,069 bp
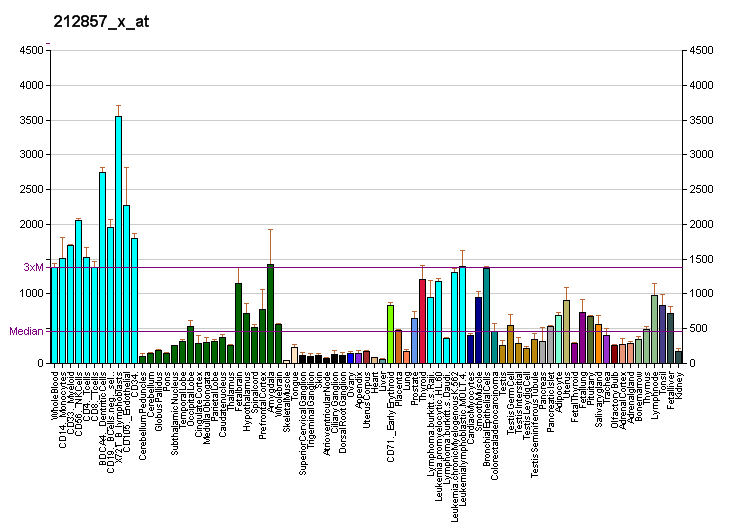

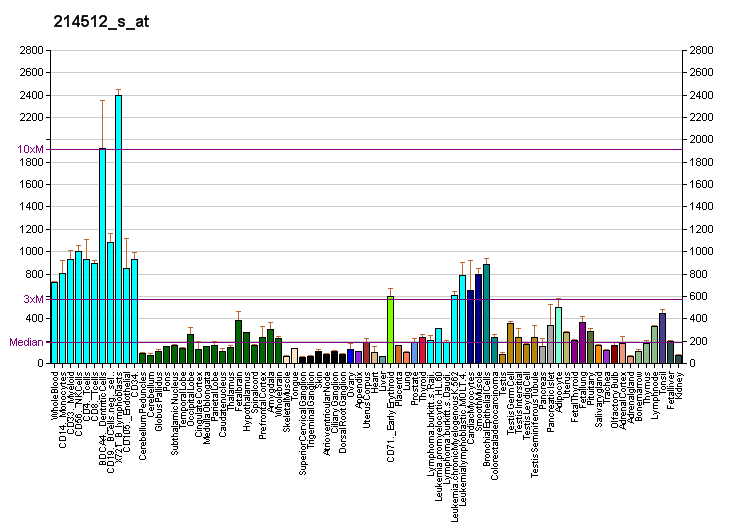

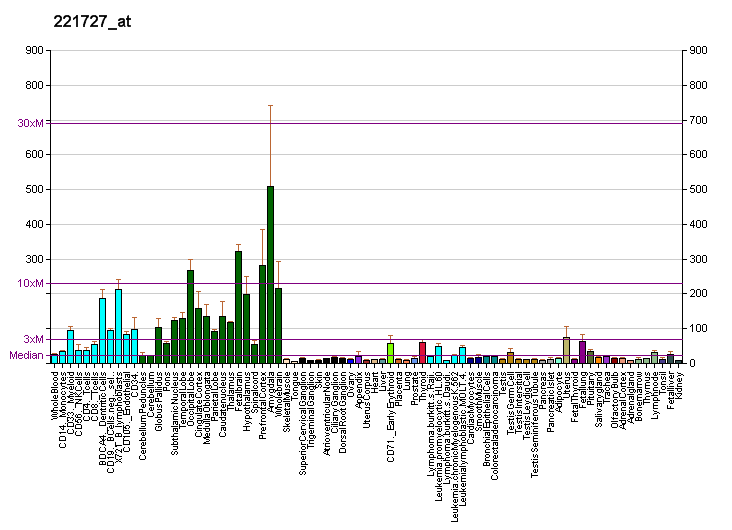
RNA expression pattern
Bgee	Human / Mouse (ortholog); Top expressed in: epithelium of nasopharynx; lactiferous duct; epithelium of colon; ganglionic eminence; gingival epithelium; parotid gland; bone marrow cell; germinal epithelium; endometrium; ventricular zone / Top expressed in: genital tubercle; tail of embryo; yolk sac; abdominal wall; primitive streak; neural tube; gastrula; medial ganglionic eminence; migratory enteric neural crest cell; embryo; More reference expression data
BioGPS	More reference expression data
Gene ontology
Molecular function	single-stranded DNA binding; DNA binding; transcription coactivator activity; DNA-binding transcription activator activity, RNA polymerase II-specific; protein binding; RNA binding; identical protein binding; sequence-specific double-stranded DNA binding
Cellular component	nucleolus; extracellular exosome; transcription regulator complex; nucleus
Biological process	regulation of transcription by RNA polymerase II; regulation of transcription, DNA-templated; transcription by RNA polymerase II; SMAD protein signal transduction; transcription, DNA-templated; positive regulation of transcription initiation from RNA polymerase II promoter
Sources:Amigo / QuickGO
Orthologs
Databases	NCBI: entry; OMA: entry
Species	Human	Mouse
Entrez	10923	20024
Ensembl	ENSG00000113387	ENSMUSG00000022205
UniProt	P53999	P11031
RefSeq (mRNA)	NM_006713	NM_011294
RefSeq (protein)	NP_006704	NP_035424
Location (UCSC)	Chr 5: 32.53 – 32.6 Mb	Chr 15: 11.98 – 12 Mb
PubMed search
- Wikidata
View/Edit Human	View/Edit Mouse

Activated RNA polymerase II transcriptional coactivator p15 also known as positive cofactor 4 (PC4) or SUB1 homolog is a protein that in humans is encoded by the SUB1 gene. The human SUB1 gene is named after an orthologous gene in yeast.

SUB1 is induced by oxidative stress, and is involved in coordinating cellular responses to DNA strand breaks that arise after oxidative stress.Yu L, Ma H, Ji X, Volkert MR (January 2016). "The Sub1 nuclear protein protects DNA from oxidative damage". Molecular and Cellular Biochemistry. 412 (1–2): 165–171. doi:10.1007/s11010-015-2621-x. PMC 5064834. PMID 26708217. Yeast SUB1 has structural and functional similarities to human alpha-synuclein, a protein that has an important role in Parkinson's disease.Schaser AJ, Osterberg VR, Dent SE, Stackhouse TL, Wakeham CM, Boutros SW, et al. (July 2019). "Alpha-synuclein is a DNA binding protein that modulates DNA repair with implications for Lewy body disorders". Scientific Reports. 9 (1): 10919. doi:10.1038/s41598-019-47227-z. PMC 6662836. PMID 31358782. Like SUB1, alpha-synuclein functions in regulating DNA repair including repair of DNA double-strand breaks.

== Interactions ==
SUB1 has been shown to interact with CSTF2.
