= BARD1 =

Protein-coding gene in humans

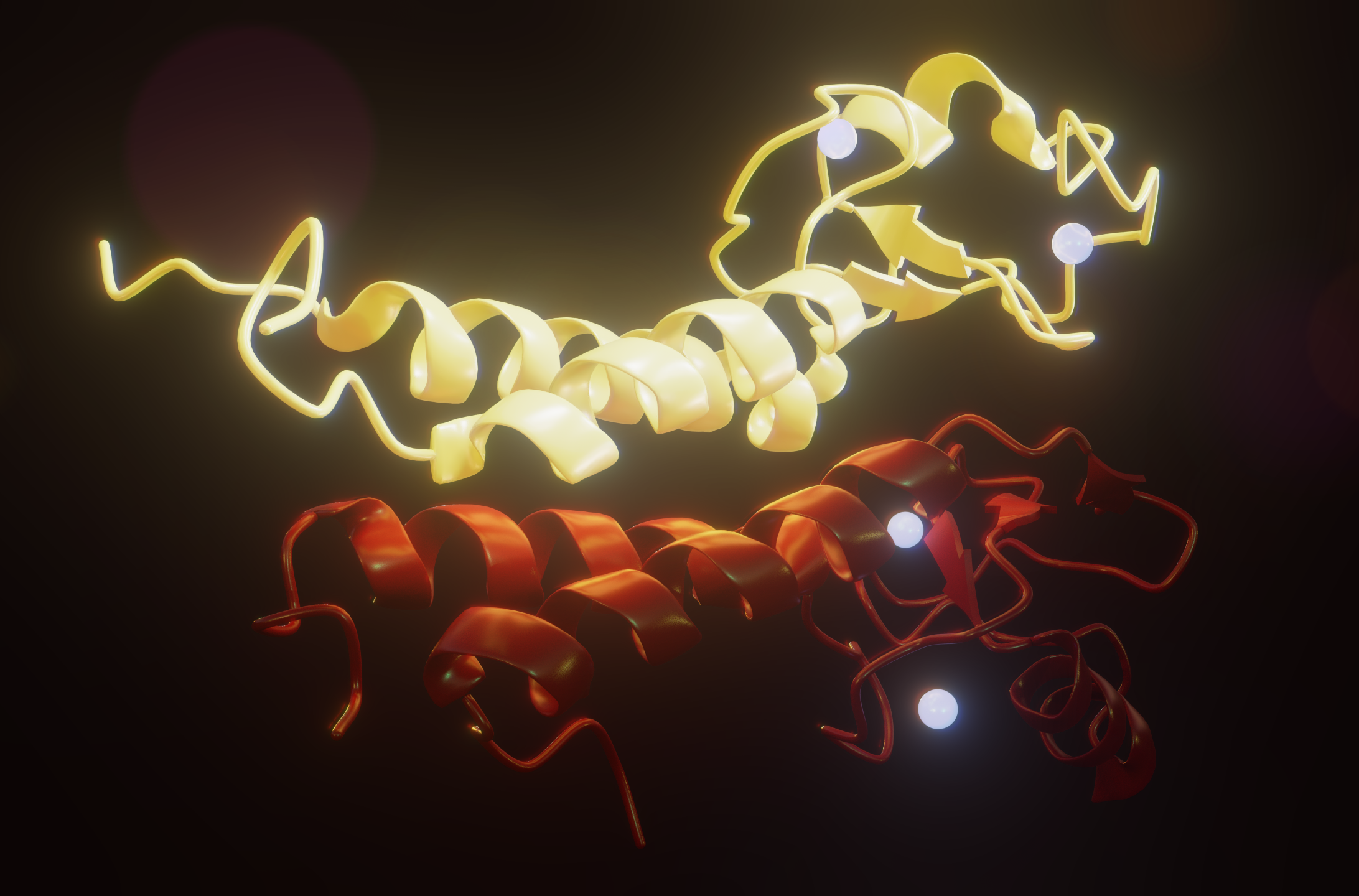

Identifiers
- Aliases: BARD1, BRCA1 associated RING domain 1
- External IDs: OMIM: 601593; MGI: 1328361; GeneCards: BARD1
Available structures
PDB	Ortholog search: PDBe RCSB
PDB	List of PDB id codes 1JM7, 2NTE, 2R1Z, 3C5R, 3FA2
Enzyme activity
EC #	BRENDA	ExPASy	KEGG	MetaCyc
2.3.2.27	↗	↗	↗	↗

Gene location (Human)
Chr.	Chromosome 2 (human)
Band	2q35	Start	214,725,646 bp
Band	2q35	End	214,809,683 bp

Gene location (Mouse)
Chr.	Chromosome 1 (mouse)
Band	1|1 C3	Start	71,066,657 bp
Band	1|1 C3	End	71,142,305 bp
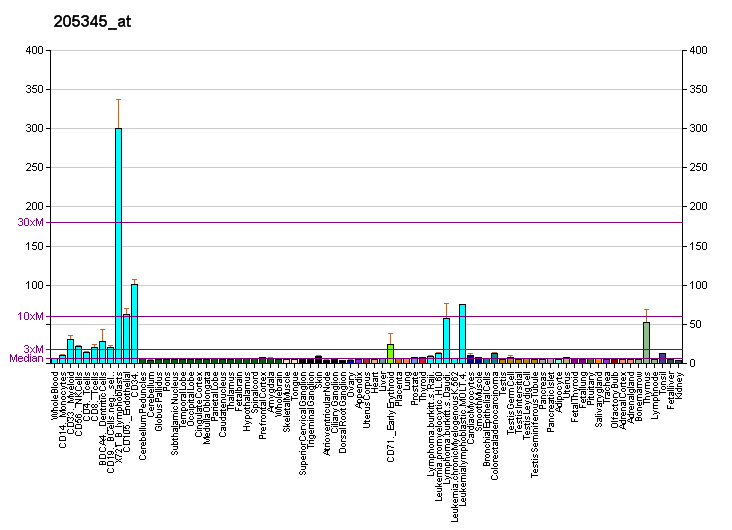
RNA expression pattern
Bgee	Human / Mouse (ortholog); Top expressed in: secondary oocyte; nipple; testicle; gonad; Achilles tendon; saphenous vein; buccal mucosa cell; human penis; mucosa of pharynx; bone marrow / Top expressed in: secondary oocyte; zygote; urethra; spermatocyte; male urethra; tail of embryo; ventricular zone; epiblast; morula; morula; More reference expression data
BioGPS	More reference expression data
Gene ontology
Molecular function	metal ion binding; protein homodimerization activity; kinase binding; RNA binding; protein heterodimerization activity; ubiquitin-protein transferase activity; protein binding; transferase activity
Cellular component	cytoplasm; BRCA1-A complex; BRCA1-BARD1 complex; ubiquitin ligase complex; nucleus; nucleoplasm; nuclear speck; cytoplasmic ribonucleoprotein granule
Biological process	regulation of phosphorylation; negative regulation of apoptotic process; protein K6-linked ubiquitination; negative regulation of mRNA 3'-end processing; positive regulation of protein catabolic process; negative regulation of protein export from nucleus; double-strand break repair via nonhomologous end joining; cellular response to DNA damage stimulus; tissue homeostasis; protein ubiquitination; positive regulation of apoptotic process; DNA replication; DNA double-strand break processing; DNA repair; protein deubiquitination; regulation of signal transduction by p53 class mediator
Sources:Amigo / QuickGO
Orthologs
Databases	NCBI: entry; OMA: entry
Species	Human	Mouse
Entrez	580	12021
Ensembl	ENSG00000138376	ENSMUSG00000026196
UniProt	Q99728	O70445
RefSeq (mRNA)	NM_000465; NM_001282543; NM_001282545; NM_001282548; NM_001282549	NM_007525
RefSeq (protein)	NP_000456; NP_001269472; NP_001269474; NP_001269477; NP_001269478 NP_001269474.1	NP_031551
Location (UCSC)	Chr 2: 214.73 – 214.81 Mb	Chr 1: 71.07 – 71.14 Mb
PubMed search
- Wikidata
View/Edit Human	View/Edit Mouse

BRCA1-associated RING domain protein 1 is a protein that in humans is encoded by the BARD1 gene. The human BARD1 protein is 777 amino acids long and contains a RING finger domain (residues 46–90), four ankyrin repeats (residues 420–555), and a tandem BRCT domain (residues 568–777).

== Function ==
Most, if not all, BRCA1 heterodimerizes with BARD1 in vivo. BARD1 and BRCA1 form a heterodimer via their N-terminal RING finger domains. The BARD1-BRCA1 interaction is observed in vivo and in vitro and is essential for BRCA1 stability. BARD1 shares homology with the two most conserved regions of BRCA1: the N-terminal RING motif and the C-terminal BRCT domain. The RING motif is a cysteine-rich sequence found in a variety of proteins that regulate cell growth, including the products of tumor suppressor genes and dominant protooncogenes, and developmentally important genes such as the polycomb group of genes. The BARD1 protein also contains three tandem ankyrin repeats.

The BARD1/BRCA1 interaction is disrupted by tumorigenic amino acid substitutions in BRCA1, implying that the formation of a stable complex between these proteins may be an essential aspect of BRCA1 tumor suppression. BARD1 may be the target of oncogenic mutations in breast or ovarian cancer. Mutations in the BARD1 protein that affect its structure appear in many breast, ovarian, and uterine cancers, suggesting the mutations disable BARD1's tumor suppressor function. Three missense mutations, each affecting BARD1's BRCT domain, are known to be implicated in cancers: C645R is associated with breast and ovarian cancers, V695L is associated with breast cancer, and S761N is associated with breast and uterine cancers. BARD1 expression is upregulated by genotoxic stress and involved in apoptosis through binding and stabilizing p53 independently of BRCA1.

BARD1 is vital in the rapid relocation of BRCA1 to DNA damage sites. BARD1 tandem BRCA1 C-terminus (BRCT) motifs fold into a binding pocket with a key lysine residue (K619), and bind to poly(ADP-ribose) (PAR), which targets the BRCA1/BARD1 heterodimer to damaged DNA sites. Double stranded breaks (DSB) in DNA trigger poly(ADPribose) polymerase 1 (PARP1) to catalyze the formation of poly(ADPribose) (PAR) so that PAR can then bind to an array of DNA response proteins, including the BRCA1/BARD1 heterodimer, and target them to DNA damage sites. When the BRCA1/BARD1 heterodimer is transported to the damaged DNA site, it acts as an E3 ubiquitin ligase. The BRCA1/BARD1 heterodimer ubiquitinates RNA polymerase II, preventing the transcription of the damaged DNA, and restoring genetic stability.

=== DNA repair ===
BRCA1/BARD1 appears to have an important function in the recruitment of RAD51 protein to DNA double-strand breaks which is a crucial early step in the homologous recombinational repair of these breaks. It is likely that BRCA1/BARD1 functions as part of a higher-order "homologous recombination mediator complex" along with two other tumor suppressor proteins BRCA2 and PALB2.

Additionally, the BRCA1/BARD1 heterodimer seems to antagonistically compete with the tumor suppressor 53BP1 to promote the homologous recombination pathway rather than non-homologous end joining during double-strand break repair. Specifically, methylation of the H4K20 dimethylation mark (H4K20me2), found in large amounts in parental and unreplicated chromatin, supports 53BP1 recruitment. However, in nascent chromosomes, where H4K20me2 is mostly diluted, H4K20me0-mediated recruitment of BRCA1/BARD1 increases, suggesting a role in cell-cycle-dependent DNA repair.

== Interactions ==
BARD1 has been shown to interact with:

- AURKB,
- BCL3,
- BRCA1,
- BRCA2,
- BRCC3,
- BRE,
- CSTF1,
- CSTF2,
- EWSR1,
- FANCD2,
- H2AFX,
- NPM1,
- P53,
- RAD51,
- TACC1, and
- UBE2D1.

== Applications ==
If a cancer cell's capacity to repair DNA damage were incapacitated, cancer treatments would be more effective. Inhibiting cancer cells' BRCA1/BARD1 heterodimer from relocating to DNA damage sites would induce tumor cell death rather than repair. One inhibition possibility is the BARD1 BRCT key lysine residue (K619). Inhibiting this lysine residue's ability to bind poly(ADP-ribose) would prevent the BRCA1/BARD1 heterodimer from localizing to DNA damage sites and subsequently prevent DNA damage repair. This would make cancer therapies such as chemotherapy and radiation vastly more effective.
