= SYMPK =

Protein-coding gene in the species Homo sapiens

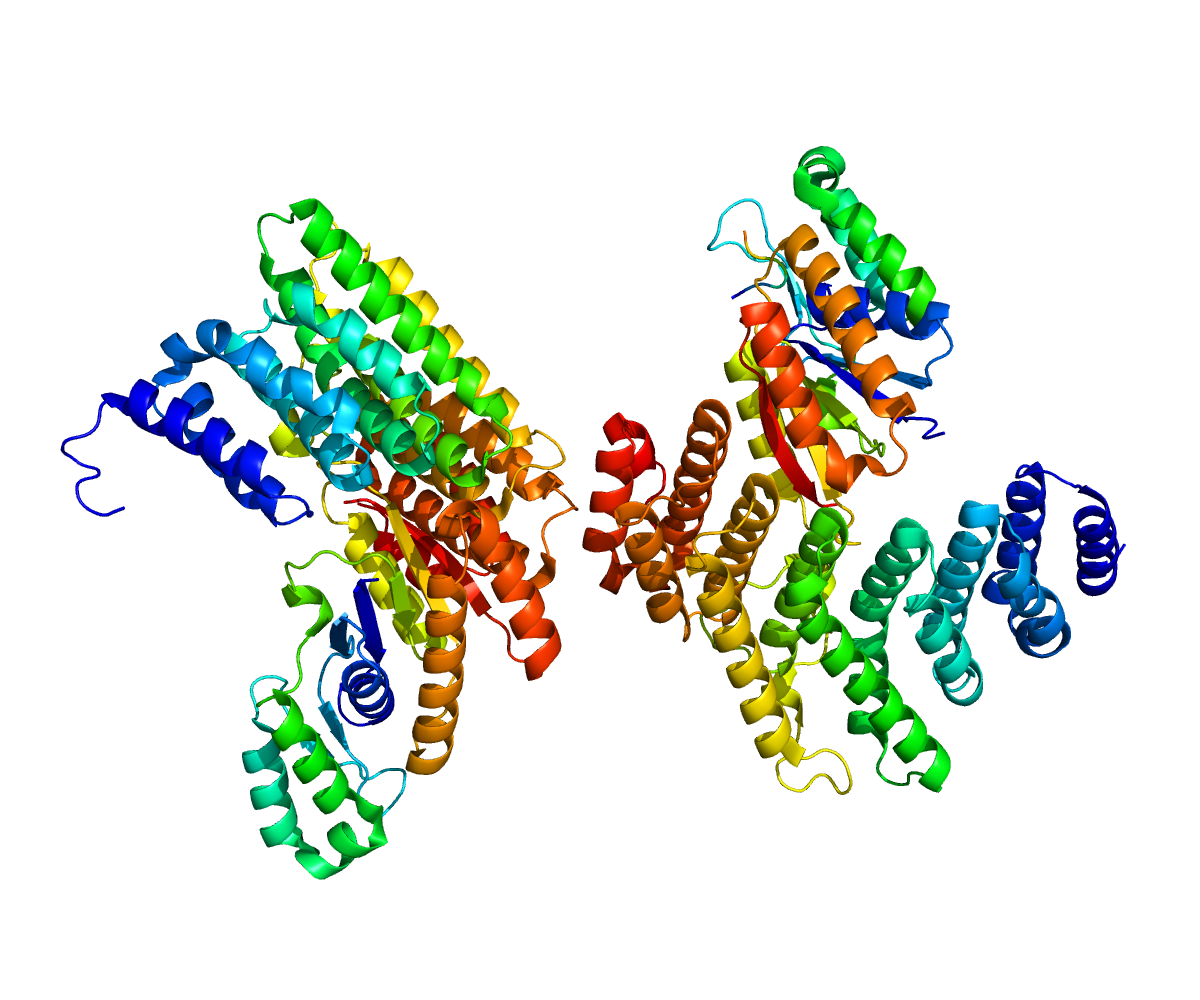

Identifiers
- Aliases: SYMPK, SPK, SYM, symplekin, Pta1, symplekin scaffold protein
- External IDs: OMIM: 602388; MGI: 1915438; GeneCards: SYMPK
Available structures
PDB	Ortholog search: PDBe RCSB
PDB	List of PDB id codes 3O2Q, 3O2S, 3O2T, 3ODR, 3ODS, 4H3H, 4H3K

Gene location (Human)
Chr.	Chromosome 19 (human)
Band	19q13.32	Start	45,815,410 bp
Band	19q13.32	End	45,863,194 bp

Gene location (Mouse)
Chr.	Chromosome 7 (mouse)
Band	7|7 A3	Start	18,758,302 bp
Band	7|7 A3	End	18,788,543 bp
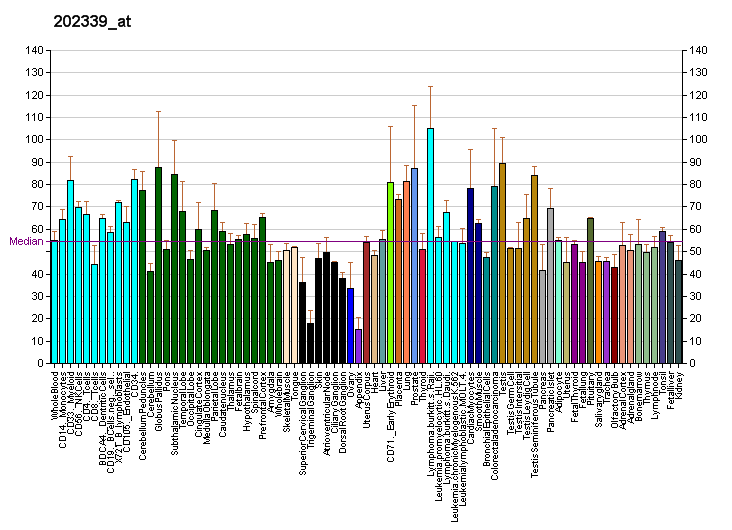

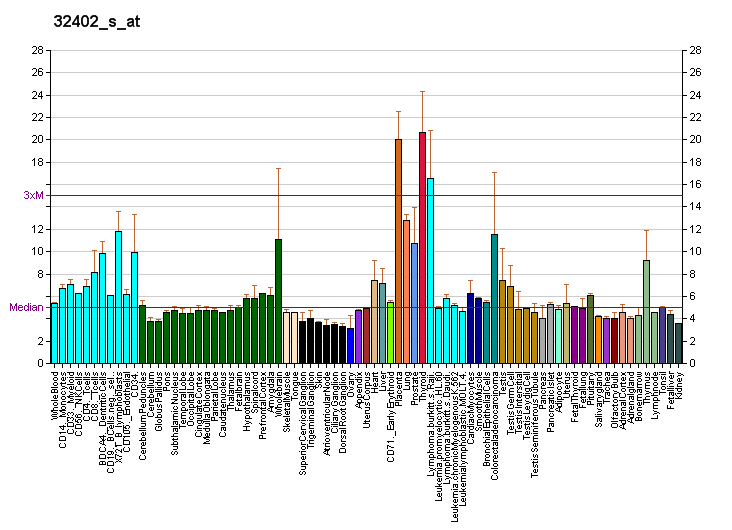
RNA expression pattern
Bgee	Human / Mouse (ortholog); Top expressed in: left testis; right testis; anterior pituitary; stromal cell of endometrium; right uterine tube; granulocyte; mucosa of transverse colon; sural nerve; right lobe of thyroid gland; right lobe of liver / Top expressed in: muscle of thigh; tail of embryo; ventricular zone; superior frontal gyrus; internal carotid artery; genital tubercle; external carotid artery; spermatid; spermatocyte; seminiferous tubule; More reference expression data
BioGPS	More reference expression data
Gene ontology
Molecular function	protein binding
Cellular component	cytoplasm; cell junction; plasma membrane; cytoskeleton; membrane; nucleus; bicellular tight junction; nucleoplasm; cytosol; nuclear stress granule
Biological process	mRNA polyadenylation; mRNA processing; cell adhesion; positive regulation of protein dephosphorylation; mRNA splicing, via spliceosome; termination of RNA polymerase II transcription; mRNA export from nucleus; mRNA 3'-end processing; negative regulation of protein binding
Sources:Amigo / QuickGO
Orthologs
Databases	NCBI: entry; OMA: entry
Species	Human	Mouse
Entrez	8189	68188
Ensembl	ENSG00000125755	ENSMUSG00000023118
UniProt	Q92797	Q80X82
RefSeq (mRNA)	NM_004819	NM_026605; NM_001360713
RefSeq (protein)	NP_004810	NP_001347642; NP_080881
Location (UCSC)	Chr 19: 45.82 – 45.86 Mb	Chr 7: 18.76 – 18.79 Mb
PubMed search
- Wikidata
View/Edit Human	View/Edit Mouse

Symplekin is a protein that in humans is encoded by the SYMPK gene.

== Function ==
This gene encodes a nuclear protein that functions in the regulation of polyadenylation and promotes gene expression. The protein forms a high-molecular weight complex with components of the polyadenylation machinery. It is thought to serve as a scaffold for recruiting regulatory factors to the polyadenylation complex. It also participates in 3'-end maturation of histone mRNAs, which do not undergo polyadenylation. The protein also localizes to the cytoplasmic plaques of tight junctions in some cell types.

== Interactions ==
SYMPK has been shown to interact with CSTF2, HSF1 and Oct4
