= UBE2D1 =

Protein-coding gene in the species Homo sapiens

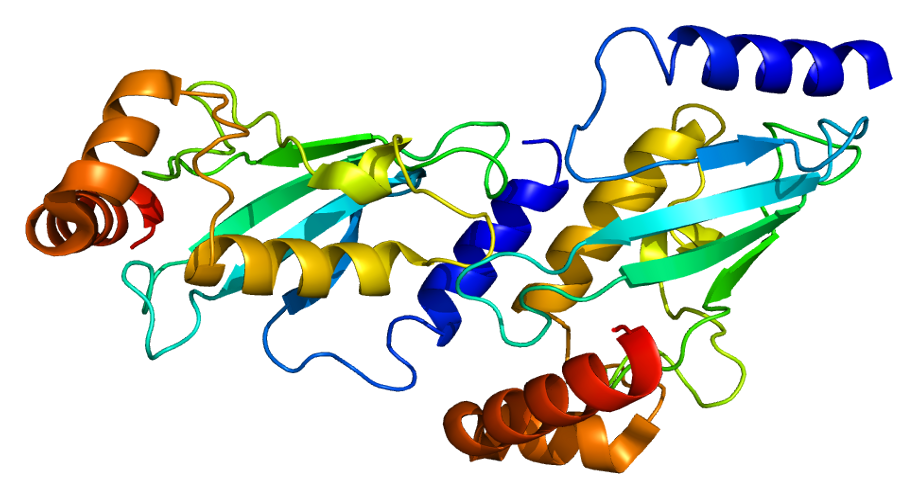

Identifiers
- Aliases: UBE2D1, E2(17)KB1, SFT, UBC4/5, UBCH5, UBCH5A, ubiquitin conjugating enzyme E2 D1
- External IDs: OMIM: 602961; MGI: 2384911; GeneCards: UBE2D1
Available structures
PDB	Ortholog search: PDBe RCSB
PDB	List of PDB id codes 2C4P, 2YHO, 3OJ4, 3PTF, 4AP4, 4QPL, 5FER
Enzyme activity
EC #	BRENDA	ExPASy	KEGG	MetaCyc
2.3.2.23	↗	↗	↗	↗
2.3.2.24	↗	↗	↗	↗

Gene location (Human)
Chr.	Chromosome 10 (human)
Band	10q21.1	Start	58,334,979 bp
Band	10q21.1	End	58,370,751 bp

Gene location (Mouse)
Chr.	Chromosome 10 (mouse)
Band	10|10 B5.3	Start	71,090,810 bp
Band	10|10 B5.3	End	71,121,092 bp
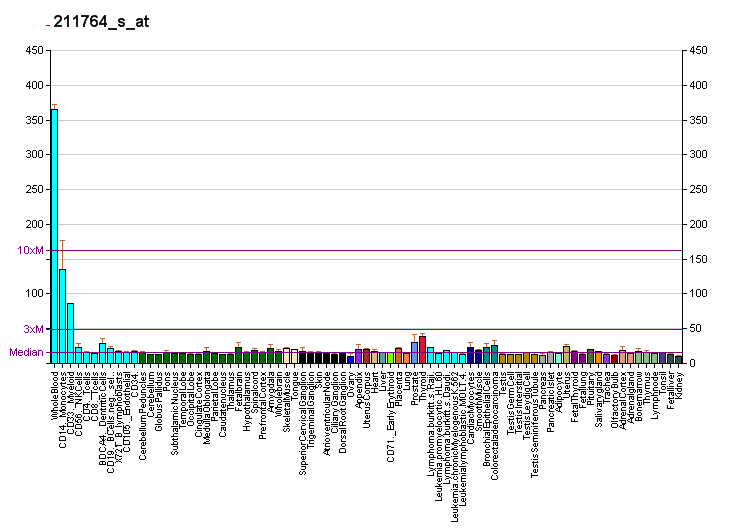

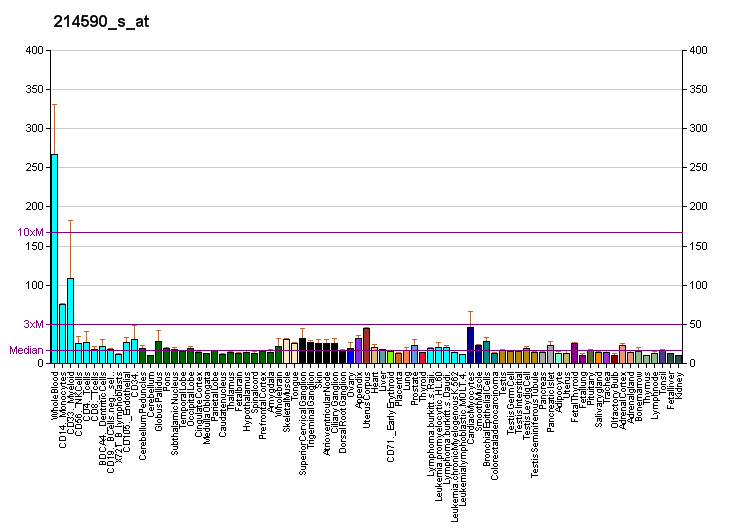
RNA expression pattern
Bgee	Human / Mouse (ortholog); Top expressed in: biceps brachii; Skeletal muscle tissue of biceps brachii; Skeletal muscle tissue of rectus abdominis; vastus lateralis muscle; right ventricle; muscle of thigh; monocyte; gastrocnemius muscle; body of tongue; thoracic diaphragm / Top expressed in: interventricular septum; triceps brachii muscle; sternocleidomastoid muscle; quadriceps femoris muscle; muscle of thigh; tail of embryo; temporal muscle; genital tubercle; skeletal muscle tissue; ankle; More reference expression data
BioGPS	More reference expression data
Gene ontology
Molecular function	nucleotide binding; ubiquitin conjugating enzyme activity; ATP binding; protein binding; ubiquitin-protein transferase activity; ubiquitin protein ligase binding
Cellular component	cytoplasm; nucleoplasm; cytosol; ubiquitin ligase complex; protein-containing complex
Biological process	protein K48-linked ubiquitination; BMP signaling pathway; protein polyubiquitination; negative regulation of transcription by RNA polymerase II; anaphase-promoting complex-dependent catabolic process; positive regulation of protein ubiquitination; ubiquitin-dependent protein catabolic process; protein ubiquitination; protein deubiquitination; positive regulation of protein polyubiquitination; protein targeting to peroxisome; regulation of mitotic cell cycle phase transition; MyD88-independent toll-like receptor signaling pathway; TRIF-dependent toll-like receptor signaling pathway
Sources:Amigo / QuickGO
Orthologs
Databases	NCBI: entry; OMA: entry
Species	Human	Mouse
Entrez	7321	216080
Ensembl	ENSG00000072401	ENSMUSG00000019927
UniProt	P51668	P61080
RefSeq (mRNA)	NM_003338; NM_001204880	NM_145420
RefSeq (protein)	NP_001191809; NP_003329	NP_663395
Location (UCSC)	Chr 10: 58.33 – 58.37 Mb	Chr 10: 71.09 – 71.12 Mb
PubMed search
- Wikidata
View/Edit Human	View/Edit Mouse

Ubiquitin-conjugating enzyme E2 D1 is a protein that in humans is encoded by the UBE2D1 gene.

== Function ==
The modification of proteins with ubiquitin is an important cellular mechanism for targeting abnormal or short-lived proteins for degradation. Ubiquitination involves at least three classes of enzymes: ubiquitin-activating enzymes, or E1s, ubiquitin-conjugating enzymes, or E2s, and ubiquitin-protein ligases, or E3s. This gene encodes a member of the E2 ubiquitin-conjugating enzyme family. This enzyme is closely related to a stimulator of iron transport (SFT), and is up-regulated in hereditary hemochromatosis. It also functions in the ubiquitination of the tumor-suppressor protein p53 and the hypoxia-inducible transcription factor HIF1alpha by interacting with the E1 ubiquitin-activating enzyme and the E3 ubiquitin-protein ligases.

== Interactions ==
UBE2D1 has been shown to interact with:

- BARD1,
- BRCA1, and
- UBE3A.
