= BABAM2 =

Protein-coding gene in humans

Identifiers
- Aliases: BABAM2, BRCC4, BRCC45, BRE, brain and reproductive organ-expressed (TNFRSF1A modulator), BRISC and BRCA1 A complex member 2
- External IDs: OMIM: 610497; MGI: 1333875; GeneCards: BABAM2

Gene location (Human)
Chr.	Chromosome 2 (human)
Band	2p23.2	Start	27,889,941 bp
Band	2p23.2	End	28,338,901 bp

Gene location (Mouse)
Chr.	Chromosome 5 (mouse)
Band	5|5 B1	Start	31,855,028 bp
Band	5|5 B1	End	32,242,306 bp
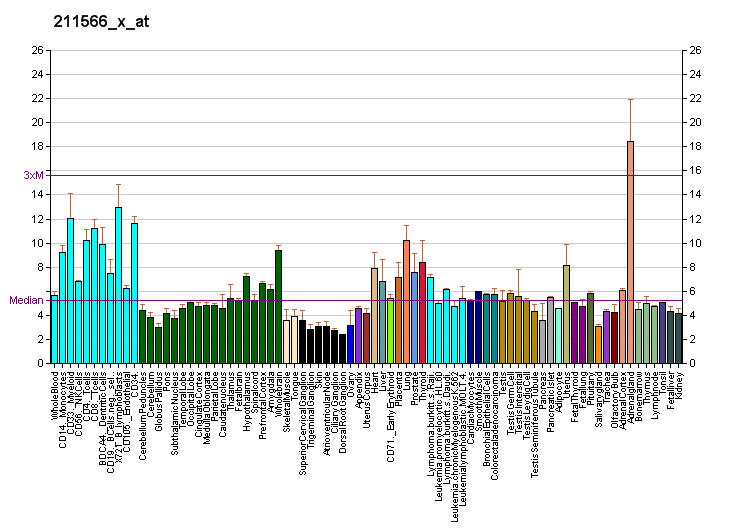

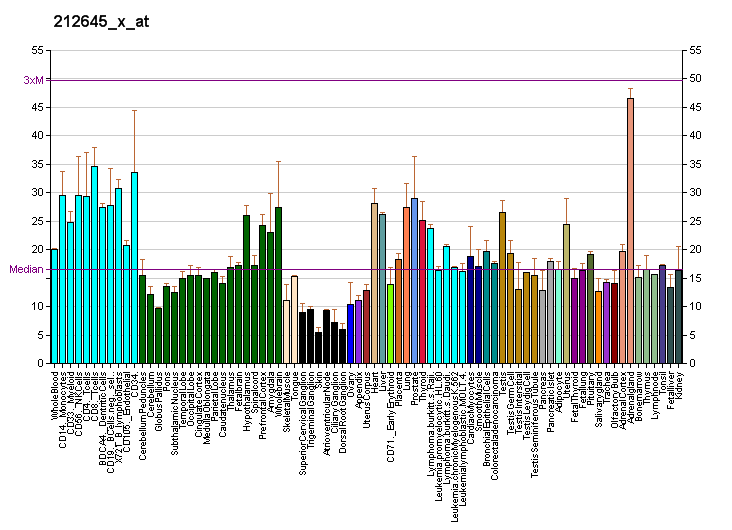

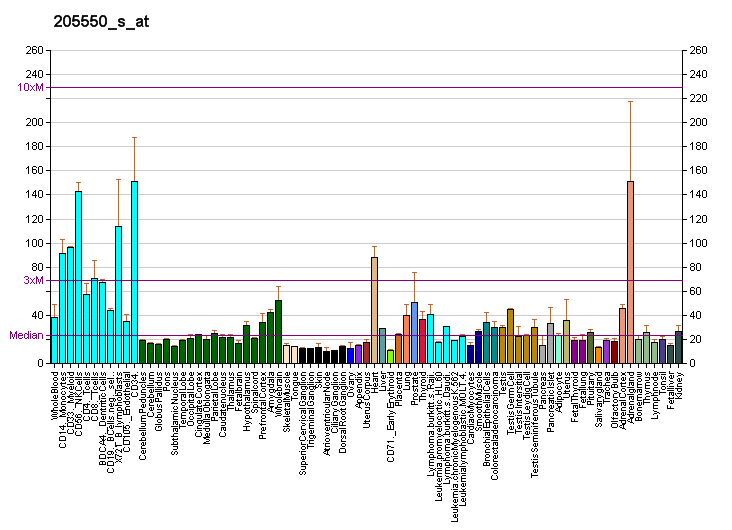
RNA expression pattern
Bgee	Human / Mouse (ortholog); Top expressed in: right adrenal gland; left adrenal cortex; right adrenal cortex; gastrocnemius muscle; right auricle of heart; popliteal artery; tibial arteries; left ventricle; muscle of thigh; anterior pituitary / Top expressed in: lens; transitional epithelium of urinary bladder; adrenal gland; ankle; brown adipose tissue; granulocyte; epithelium of lens; left lobe of liver; muscle of thigh; epithelium of stomach; More reference expression data
BioGPS	More reference expression data
Gene ontology
Molecular function	peroxisome targeting sequence binding; polyubiquitin modification-dependent protein binding; protein binding; tumor necrosis factor receptor binding
Cellular component	nuclear ubiquitin ligase complex; nucleoplasm; nucleus; cytoplasm; cytosol; BRCA1-A complex; BRISC complex
Biological process	response to ionizing radiation; positive regulation of DNA repair; cell division; protein K63-linked deubiquitination; cell cycle; double-strand break repair via nonhomologous end joining; signal transduction; apoptotic process; DNA repair; cellular response to DNA damage stimulus; double-strand break repair; protein deubiquitination; negative regulation of apoptotic process; mitotic G2 DNA damage checkpoint signaling; chromatin organization
Sources:Amigo / QuickGO
Orthologs
Databases	NCBI: entry; OMA: entry
Species	Human	Mouse
Entrez	9577	107976
Ensembl	ENSG00000158019	ENSMUSG00000052139
UniProt	Q9NXR7	Q8K3W0
RefSeq (mRNA)	NM_001261840; NM_001329112; NM_001329113; NM_001329114; NM_001329115 NM_004899; NM_199191; NM_199192; NM_199193; NM_199194	NM_144541; NM_181279; NM_181280; NM_181281; NM_181282
RefSeq (protein)	NP_001248769; NP_001316041; NP_001316042; NP_001316043; NP_001316044 NP_004890; NP_954661; NP_954662; NP_954663; NP_954664	NP_653124; NP_851796; NP_851797; NP_851798; NP_851799
Location (UCSC)	Chr 2: 27.89 – 28.34 Mb	Chr 5: 31.86 – 32.24 Mb
PubMed search
- Wikidata
View/Edit Human	View/Edit Mouse

BRISC and BRCA1-A complex member 2 is a protein that in humans is encoded by the BABAM2 gene.

== Repair of DNA damage ==
BRISC and BRCA1-A complex member 2 is a core component of the deubiquitin complex BRCA1-A. Other core components of the BRCA1-A complex are the BRCC36 protein (BRCC3 gene), MERIT40 protein (BABAM1 gene), and RAP80 protein (UIMC1 gene).

BRCA1, as distinct from BRCA1-A, is employed in the repair of chromosomal damage with an important role in the error-free homologous recombinational (HR) repair of DNA double-strand breaks. Sequestration of BRCA1 away from the DNA damage site suppresses homologous recombination and redirects the cell in the direction of repair by the process of non-homologous end joining (NHEJ). The role of BRCA1-A appears to be to bind BRCA1 with high affinity and withdraw it away from the site of DNA damage to the periphery where it remains sequestered, thus promoting NHEJ in preference to HR.

== Protein-protein interactions ==
BABAM2 has been shown to interact with:

- BARD1,
- BRCA1,
- BRCA2,
- BRCC3,
- C19orf62,
- P53, and
- RAD51.
