= Cleavage stimulation factor =

Cleavage stimulatory factor or cleavage stimulation factor (CstF or CStF) is a heterotrimeric protein involved in the cleavage of the 3' signaling region from a newly synthesized pre-messenger RNA (mRNA) molecule. It recognizes U/GU‑rich elements (GREs) downstream of pre‑mRNA cleavage sites and promotes endonucleolytic cleavage and subsequent polyadenylation (poly(A)) of eukaryotic pre‑mRNAs.

CstF is recruited by cleavage and polyadenylation specificity factor (CPSF) and assembles into a protein complex on the 3' end to promote the synthesis of a functional polyadenine tail (poly(A) tail), which results in a mature mRNA molecule ready to be exported from the cell nucleus to the cytosol for translation.

CstF is made up of the proteins CSTF1, CSTF2 and CSTF3, totaling about 200 kDa. CSTF2 is the primary RNA-binding subunit that recognizes GREs downstream of the cleavage site.

The amount of CstF in a cell is dependent on the phase of the cell cycle, increasing significantly during the transition from G0 phase to S phase in mouse fibroblast and human splenic B cells.

== Structure ==
CstF is made of three subunits that each perform different functions of the larger protein complex. The subunits interact with each other to stabilize the complex and increase poly(A) efficiency.

CSTF1 (also referred to as CstF-50) is the smallest subunit of CstF weighing around 50 kDa. It interacts with CSTF3 to support complex assembly, though the full mechanism is unknown. Studies speculate that CSTF1 acts as a clamp at the CSTF2 binding site on CSTF3, reducing flexibility in the bond and creating more favorable RNA binding. Additionally, its N-terminus mediates homodimerization.

The second-largest CstF subunit is CSTF2 (also referred to as CstF-64) weighing around 64 kDa. It is the primary RNA-binding subunit and contains an RNA recognition motif (RRM) that binds to GREs in pre-mRNA. This binding attaches the poly(A) tail to the 3' end of pre-mRNAs, resulting in mature RNA. CSTF2 also affects cell growth, with studies finding that a significant reduction of CSTF2 in B cells reduces m-RNA accumulation and causes apoptosis upon depletion.

CSTF3 (also referred to as CstF-77) is the largest subunit of CstF weighing around 77 kDa. It holds the larger complex together and stabilizes interactions between CSTF2 and 3'-end factors such as symplekin. It also interacts with CPSF subunit CPSF160, which is partially responsible for poly(A) site specification and synthesis of the poly(A) tail.

== Clinical significance ==
=== Cancer ===
Some studies have identified CSTF2 as a potential target for cancer detection and progression. Certain cancers, including prostate cancer, breast cancer and pancreatic cancer, have been associated with elevated CSTF2 expression, suggesting that it contributes to the pathological development and progression of cancer. CSTF2 has been suggested for use as a biomarker for early cancer diagnosis and potential target for future drugs. There are currently no clinical applications of CSTF2 or CstF.
