= CSTF2T =

Protein-coding gene in humans

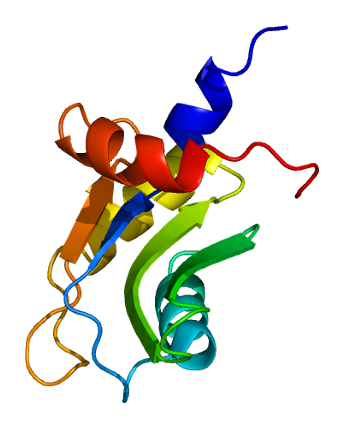

Identifiers
- Aliases: CSTF2T, CstF-64T, cleavage stimulation factor subunit 2, tau variant, cleavage stimulation factor subunit 2 tau variant
- External IDs: OMIM: 611968; MGI: 1932622; GeneCards: CSTF2T

Gene location (Human)
| Chr. | Chromosome 10 (human) |
| Band | 10q21.1 | Start | 51,695,486 bp |
| Band | 10q21.1 | End | 51,699,595 bp |

Gene location (Mouse)
| Chr. | Chromosome 19 (mouse) |
| Band | 19|19 C1 | Start | 31,060,237 bp |
| Band | 19|19 C1 | End | 31,064,469 bp |
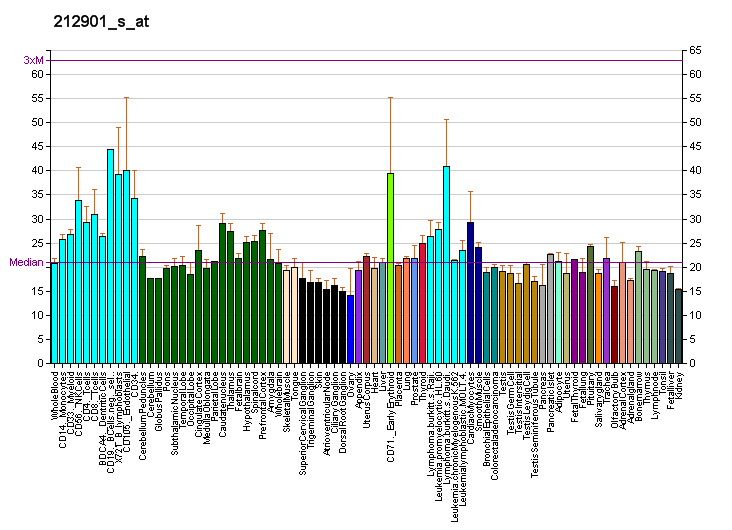

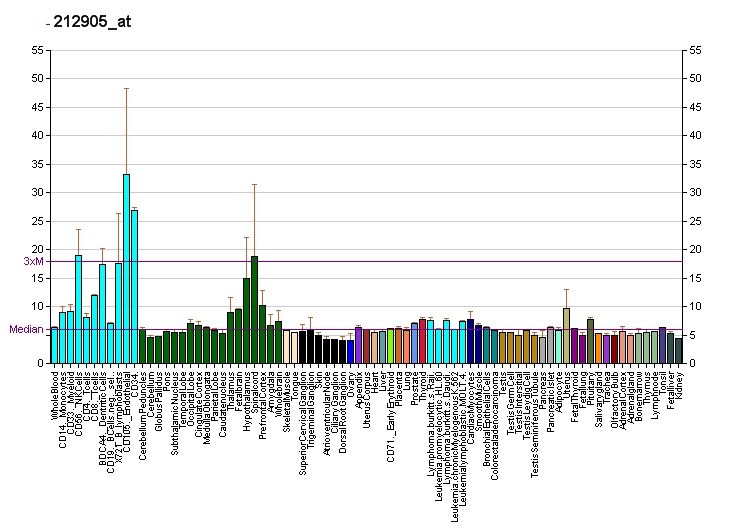
RNA expression pattern
| Bgee | Human / Mouse (ortholog); Top expressed in: endothelial cell; germinal epithelium; Epithelium of choroid plexus; parietal pleura; pons; islet of Langerhans; ganglionic eminence; corpus callosum; Descending thoracic aorta; subthalamic nucleus / Top expressed in: pineal gland; medial ganglionic eminence; olfactory tubercle; habenula; lateral septal nucleus; anterior amygdaloid area; subiculum; lobe of cerebellum; cerebellar vermis; median eminence; More reference expression data |
| BioGPS | More reference expression data |
Gene ontology
| Molecular function | protein binding; mRNA binding; nucleic acid binding; RNA binding |
| Cellular component | mRNA cleavage and polyadenylation specificity factor complex; intracellular anatomical structure; nucleus; nucleoplasm |
| Biological process | mRNA processing; pre-mRNA cleavage required for polyadenylation; mRNA splicing, via spliceosome; termination of RNA polymerase II transcription; mRNA 3'-end processing |
Sources:Amigo / QuickGO
Orthologs
| Databases | NCBI: entry; OMA: entry |
| Species | Human | Mouse |
| Entrez | 23283 | 83410 |
| Ensembl | ENSG00000177613 | ENSMUSG00000053536 |
| UniProt | Q9H0L4 | Q8C7E9 |
| RefSeq (mRNA) | NM_015235 | NM_031249 |
| RefSeq (protein) | NP_056050 | NP_112539 |
| Location (UCSC) | Chr 10: 51.7 – 51.7 Mb | Chr 19: 31.06 – 31.06 Mb |
| PubMed search |
- Wikidata
| View/Edit Human | View/Edit Mouse |

Cleavage stimulation factor 64 kDa subunit, tau variant is a protein that in humans is encoded by the CSTF2T gene.
