= CPSF4 =

Protein-coding gene in humans

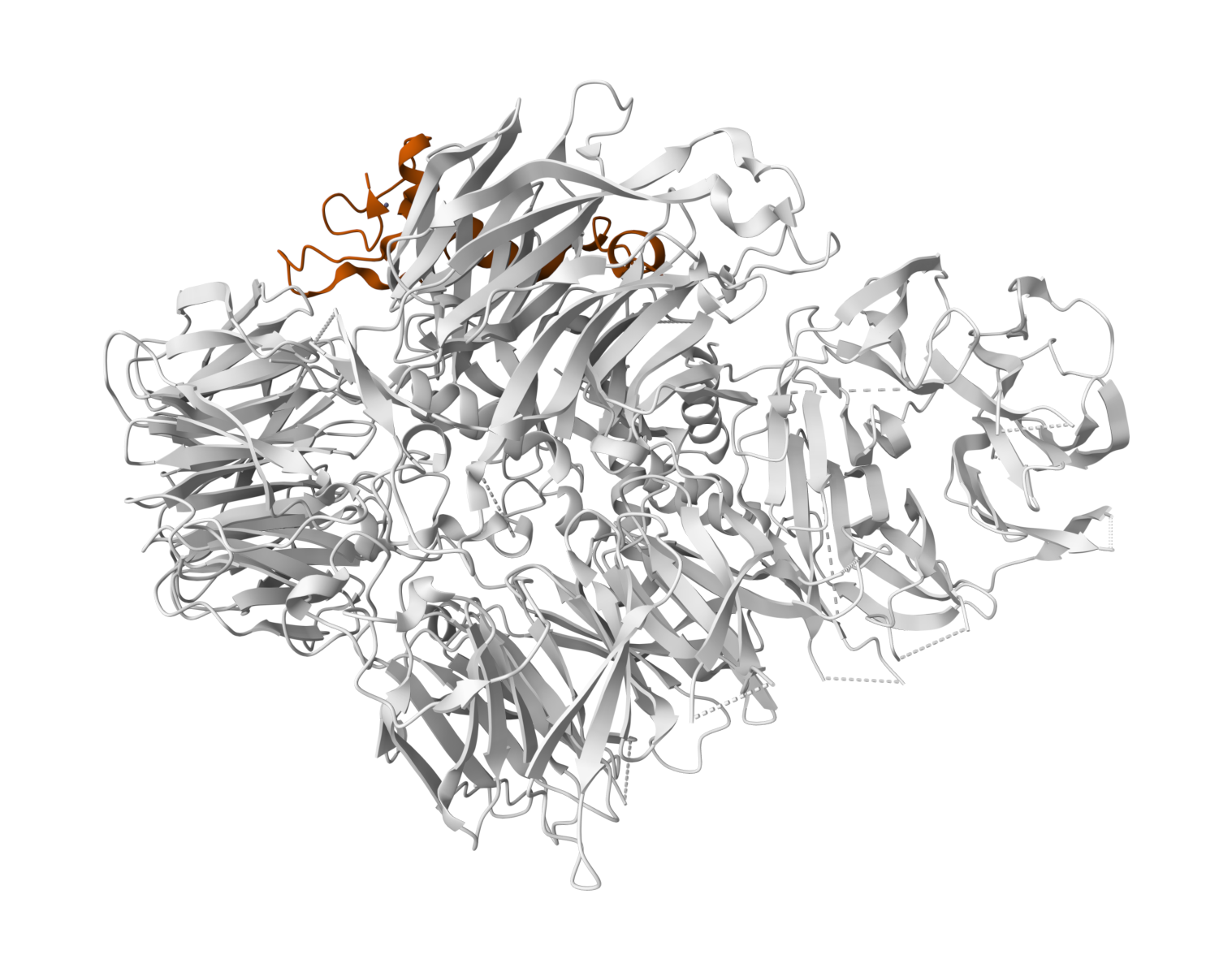

Identifiers
- Aliases: CPSF4, CPSF30, NAR, NEB1, NEB-1, cleavage and polyadenylation specific factor 4
- External IDs: OMIM: 603052; MGI: 1861602; GeneCards: CPSF4
Available structures
PDB	Ortholog search: PDBe RCSB
PDB	List of PDB id codes 2D9N, 2RHK

Gene location (Human)
Chr.	Chromosome 7 (human)
Band	7q22.1	Start	99,438,922 bp
Band	7q22.1	End	99,457,373 bp

Gene location (Mouse)
Chr.	Chromosome 5 (mouse)
Band	5|5 G2	Start	145,104,023 bp
Band	5|5 G2	End	145,118,851 bp
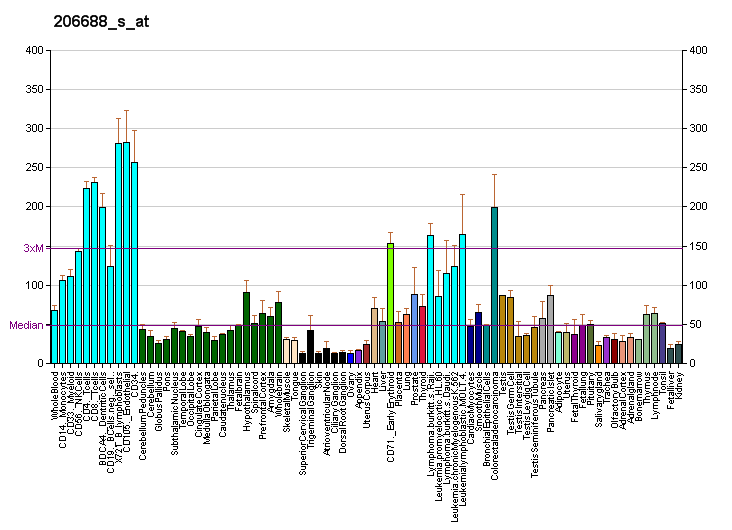
RNA expression pattern
Bgee	Human / Mouse (ortholog); Top expressed in: secondary oocyte; right hemisphere of cerebellum; gastric mucosa; right frontal lobe; left testis; right testis; tibial nerve; endothelial cell; body of pancreas; ectocervix / Top expressed in: epiblast; cumulus cell; yolk sac; internal carotid artery; external carotid artery; mandibular prominence; maxillary prominence; somite; spermatocyte; blood; More reference expression data
BioGPS	More reference expression data
Gene ontology
Molecular function	nucleic acid binding; zinc ion binding; protein binding; metal ion binding; endoribonuclease activity; RNA binding
Cellular component	mRNA cleavage and polyadenylation specificity factor complex; nucleus; nucleoplasm; intracellular membrane-bounded organelle
Biological process	mRNA processing; modification by virus of host mRNA processing; viral process; tRNA splicing, via endonucleolytic cleavage and ligation; mRNA splicing, via spliceosome; termination of RNA polymerase II transcription; mRNA polyadenylation; mRNA export from nucleus; mRNA 3'-end processing; RNA phosphodiester bond hydrolysis, endonucleolytic; pre-mRNA cleavage required for polyadenylation
Sources:Amigo / QuickGO
Orthologs
Databases	NCBI: entry; OMA: entry
Species	Human	Mouse
Entrez	10898	54188
Ensembl	ENSG00000160917	ENSMUSG00000029625
UniProt	O95639	Q8BQZ5
RefSeq (mRNA)	NM_001081559; NM_006693; NM_001318160; NM_001318161; NM_001318162	NM_001291248; NM_001291249; NM_178576; NM_001374716
RefSeq (protein)	NP_001075028; NP_001305089; NP_001305090; NP_001305091; NP_006684	NP_001278177; NP_001278178; NP_848671; NP_001361645
Location (UCSC)	Chr 7: 99.44 – 99.46 Mb	Chr 5: 145.1 – 145.12 Mb
PubMed search
- Wikidata
View/Edit Human	View/Edit Mouse

Cleavage and polyadenylation specificity factor subunit 4 is a protein that in humans is encoded by the CPSF4 gene.

Inhibition of the nuclear export of poly(A)-containing mRNAs caused by the influenza A virus NS1 protein requires its effector domain. The NS1 effector domain functionally interacts with the cellular 30 kDa subunit of cleavage and polyadenylation specific factor 4, an essential component of the 3' end processing machinery of cellular pre-mRNAs.

In influenza virus-infected cells, the NS1 protein is physically associated with cleavage and polyadenylation specific factor 4, 30kD subunit. Binding of the NS1 protein to the 30 kDa protein in vitro prevents CPSF binding to the RNA substrate and inhibits 3' end cleavage and polyadenylation of host pre-mRNAs.

Thus the NS1 protein selectively inhibits the nuclear export of cellular, and not viral, mRNAs. Multiple alternatively spliced transcript variants that encode different isoforms have been described for this gene.
