= TENT5D =

Protein-coding gene in the species Homo sapiens

Identifiers
- Aliases: TENT5D, CT1.26, CT112, family with sequence similarity 46 member D, FAM46D, terminal nucleotidyltransferase 5D
- External IDs: OMIM: 300976; MGI: 2685223; HomoloGene: 26572; GeneCards: TENT5D; OMA:TENT5D - orthologs

Gene location (Human)
Chr.	X chromosome (human)
Band	Xq21.1	Start	80,335,504 bp
Band	Xq21.1	End	80,445,311 bp

Gene location (Mouse)
Chr.	X chromosome (mouse)
Band	X|X D	Start	106,836,196 bp
Band	X|X D	End	106,916,515 bp
RNA expression pattern
Bgee	Human / Mouse (ortholog); Top expressed in: sperm; testicle; secondary oocyte; gonad; right testis; left testis; lower lobe of lung; ovary / Top expressed in: spermatid; spermatocyte; testicle; embryo; secondary oocyte; zygote; primary oocyte; epiblast; yolk sac; pancreas; More reference expression data
BioGPS	n/a
Orthologs
Species	Human	Mouse
Entrez	169966	213449
Ensembl	ENSG00000174016	ENSMUSG00000073007
UniProt	Q8NEK8	n/a
RefSeq (mRNA)	NM_001170574; NM_152630	NM_001163104; NM_001271008
RefSeq (protein)	NP_001164045; NP_689843	n/a
Location (UCSC)	Chr X: 80.34 – 80.45 Mb	Chr X: 106.84 – 106.92 Mb
PubMed search
- Wikidata
View/Edit Human	View/Edit Mouse

Terminal nucleotidyltransferase 5D is a protein that in humans is encoded by the TENT5D gene.

== Function ==
Antibodies against the protein encoded by this gene were found only in plasma from cancer patients. While it may be a target for immunotherapy, the function of this gene is unknown. [provided by RefSeq, Dec 2009].
