= CPSF2 =

Protein-coding gene in humans

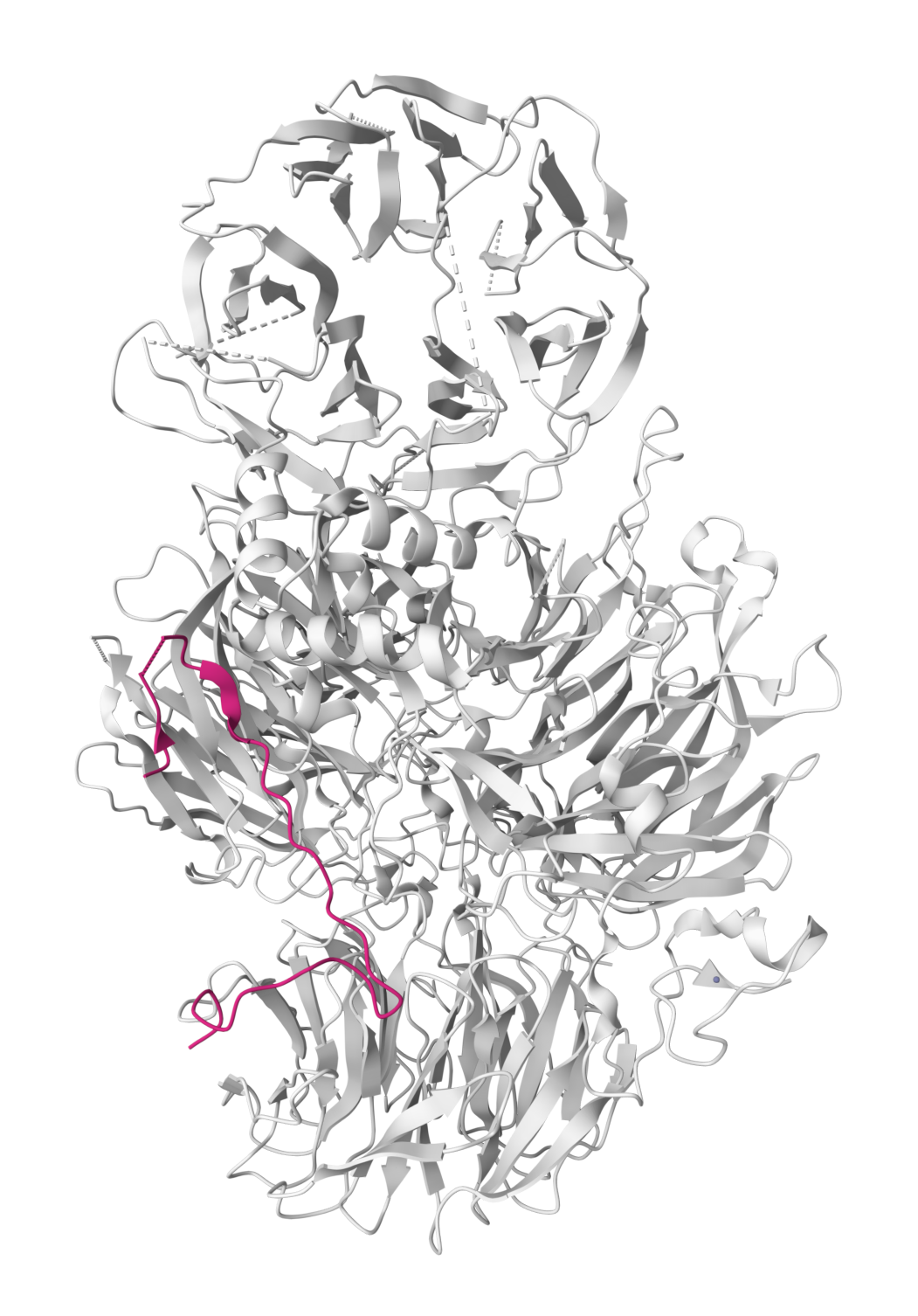

Identifiers
- Aliases: CPSF2, CPSF100, cleavage and polyadenylation specific factor 2
- External IDs: OMIM: 606028; MGI: 1861601; GeneCards: CPSF2

Gene location (Human)
| Chr. | Chromosome 14 (human) |
| Band | 14q32.12 | Start | 92,121,969 bp |
| Band | 14q32.12 | End | 92,172,145 bp |

Gene location (Mouse)
| Chr. | Chromosome 12 (mouse) |
| Band | 12|12 E | Start | 101,942,247 bp |
| Band | 12|12 E | End | 101,972,683 bp |
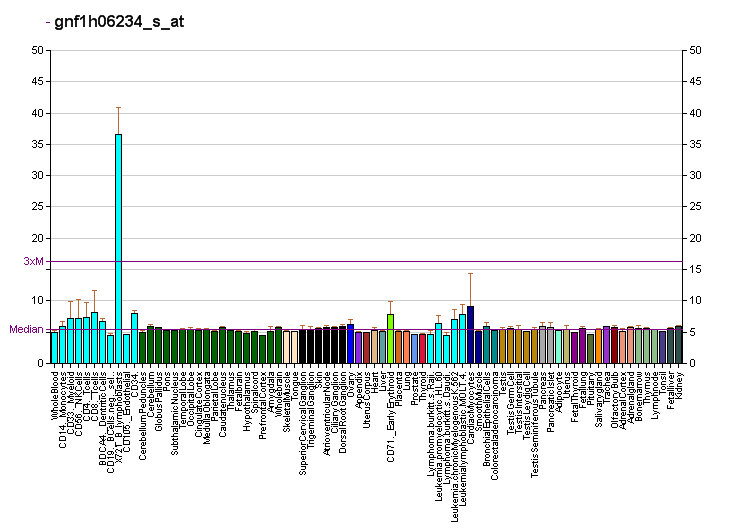

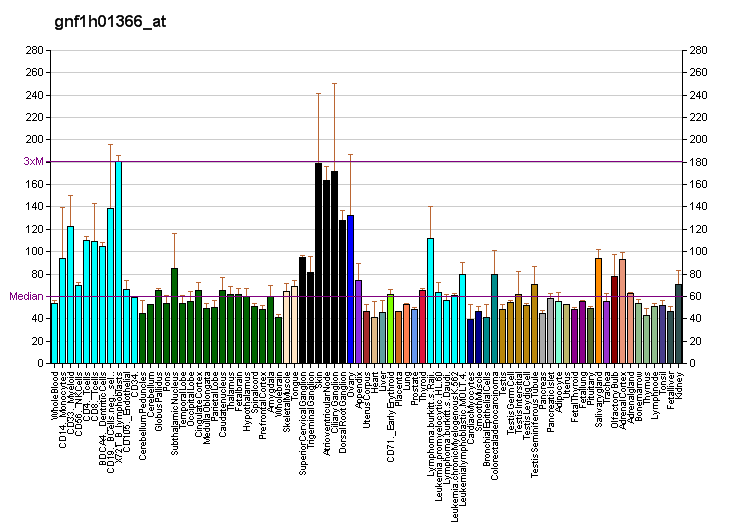
RNA expression pattern
| Bgee | Human / Mouse (ortholog); Top expressed in: buccal mucosa cell; tendon of biceps brachii; epithelium of colon; islet of Langerhans; stromal cell of endometrium; Achilles tendon; skin of arm; ventricular zone; appendix; monocyte / Top expressed in: Ileal epithelium; Rostral migratory stream; tail of embryo; genital tubercle; lumbar spinal ganglion; medial ganglionic eminence; embryonic cell; migratory enteric neural crest cell; zygote; human fetus; More reference expression data |
| BioGPS | More reference expression data |
Gene ontology
| Molecular function | protein binding; RNA binding |
| Cellular component | mRNA cleavage and polyadenylation specificity factor complex; membrane; nucleus; nucleoplasm |
| Biological process | mRNA splicing, via spliceosome; termination of RNA polymerase II transcription; mRNA polyadenylation; mRNA processing; mRNA cleavage; mRNA 3'-end processing by stem-loop binding and cleavage; mRNA 3'-end processing; mRNA export from nucleus |
Sources:Amigo / QuickGO
Orthologs
| Databases | NCBI: entry; OMA: entry |
| Species | Human | Mouse |
| Entrez | 53981 | 51786 |
| Ensembl | ENSG00000165934 | ENSMUSG00000041781 |
| UniProt | Q9P2I0 | O35218 |
| RefSeq (mRNA) | NM_017437; NM_001322270; NM_001322271; NM_001322272 | NM_016856 |
| RefSeq (protein) | NP_001309199; NP_001309200; NP_001309201; NP_059133 | NP_058552 |
| Location (UCSC) | Chr 14: 92.12 – 92.17 Mb | Chr 12: 101.94 – 101.97 Mb |
| PubMed search |
- Wikidata
| View/Edit Human | View/Edit Mouse |

Cleavage and polyadenylation specificity factor subunit 2 is a protein that in humans is encoded by the CPSF2 gene. This protein is a subunit of the cleavage and polyadenylation specificity factor (CPSF) complex which plays a key role in pre-mRNA 3' end processing and polyadenylation. The CPSF2 protein connects the two subunits of the complex, mCF and mPSF. Its structure contributes both to the stability of the subunits interaction and to the flexibility of the complex necessary for function. This protein has been identified as an essential subunit of the complex as certain mutations in the region inhibit CPSF complex formation.
