= CPSF3 =

Protein-coding gene in humans

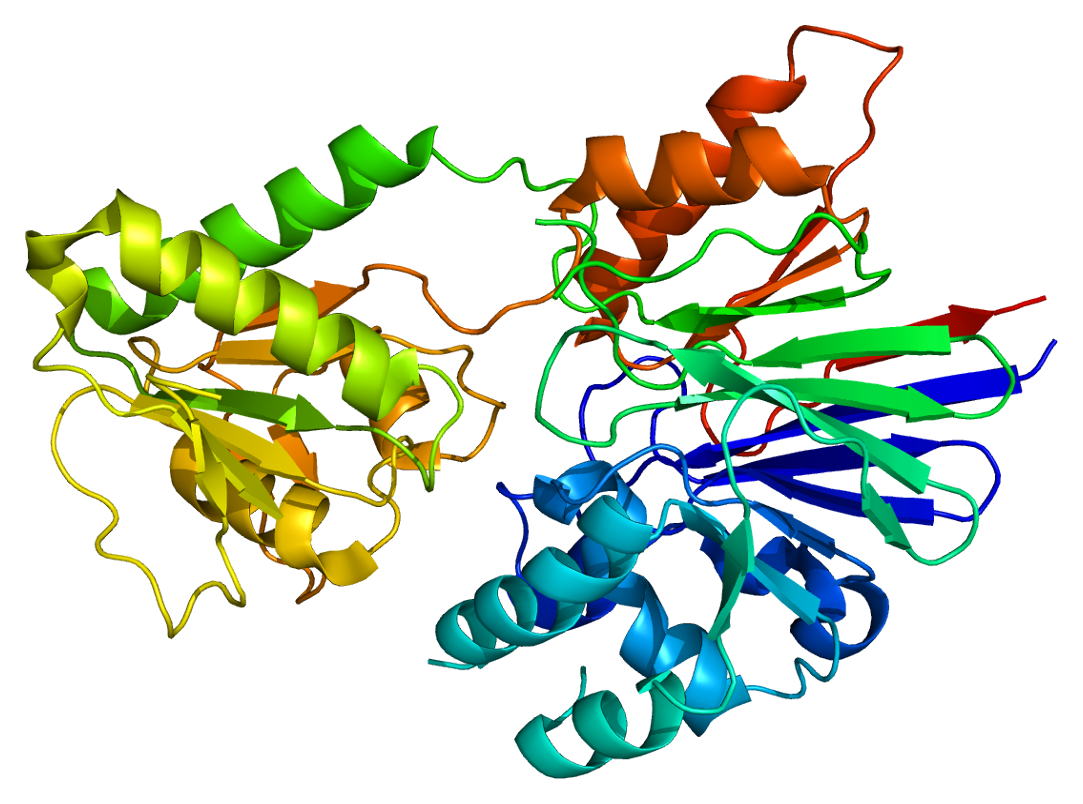

Identifiers
- Aliases: CPSF3, CPSF-73, CPSF73, cleavage and polyadenylation specific factor 3
- External IDs: OMIM: 606029; MGI: 1859328; GeneCards: CPSF3
Available structures
PDB	Ortholog search: PDBe RCSB
PDB	List of PDB id codes 2I7T, 2I7V

Gene location (Human)
Chr.	Chromosome 2 (human)
Band	2p25.1	Start	9,423,651 bp
Band	2p25.1	End	9,473,101 bp

Gene location (Mouse)
Chr.	Chromosome 12 (mouse)
Band	12|12 A1.3	Start	21,335,392 bp
Band	12|12 A1.3	End	21,365,057 bp
RNA expression pattern
Bgee	Human / Mouse (ortholog); Top expressed in: ganglionic eminence; ventricular zone; left testis; right testis; endothelial cell; tendon of biceps brachii; sperm; monocyte; stromal cell of endometrium; islet of Langerhans / Top expressed in: primitive streak; medullary collecting duct; ureter; internal carotid artery; condyle; fossa; vas deferens; Epithelium of choroid plexus; external carotid artery; endothelial cell of lymphatic vessel; More reference expression data
BioGPS	n/a
Gene ontology
Molecular function	5'-3' exonuclease activity; metal ion binding; endoribonuclease activity; protein binding; RNA binding; nuclease activity; endonuclease activity; hydrolase activity
Cellular component	mRNA cleavage and polyadenylation specificity factor complex; nucleoplasm; nucleus
Biological process	mRNA splicing, via spliceosome; termination of RNA polymerase II transcription; mRNA 3'-end processing by stem-loop binding and cleavage; mRNA processing; mRNA export from nucleus; mRNA polyadenylation; mRNA cleavage; mRNA 3'-end processing; RNA phosphodiester bond hydrolysis, endonucleolytic; sno(s)RNA 3'-end processing; snoRNA splicing; pre-mRNA cleavage required for polyadenylation
Sources:Amigo / QuickGO
Orthologs
Databases	NCBI: entry; OMA: entry
Species	Human	Mouse
Entrez	51692	54451
Ensembl	ENSG00000119203	ENSMUSG00000054309
UniProt	Q9UKF6	Q9QXK7
RefSeq (mRNA)	NM_016207; NM_001321833; NM_001321834; NM_001321835; NM_001321836	NM_018813; NM_001364372; NM_001364373
RefSeq (protein)	NP_001308762; NP_001308763; NP_001308764; NP_001308765; NP_057291	NP_061283; NP_001351301; NP_001351302
Location (UCSC)	Chr 2: 9.42 – 9.47 Mb	Chr 12: 21.34 – 21.37 Mb
PubMed search
- Wikidata
View/Edit Human	View/Edit Mouse

Cleavage and polyadenylation specificity factor subunit 3 is a protein that in humans is encoded by the CPSF3 gene.
