= CSTF1 =

Protein-coding gene in humans

Identifiers
- Aliases: CSTF1, CstF-50, CstFp50, cleavage stimulation factor subunit 1
- External IDs: OMIM: 600369; MGI: 1914587; GeneCards: CSTF1

Gene location (Human)
Chr.	Chromosome 20 (human)
Band	20q13.2-q13.31	Start	56,392,371 bp
Band	20q13.2-q13.31	End	56,406,362 bp

Gene location (Mouse)
Chr.	Chromosome 2 (mouse)
Band	2 H3|2 94.84 cM	Start	172,212,601 bp
Band	2 H3|2 94.84 cM	End	172,224,368 bp
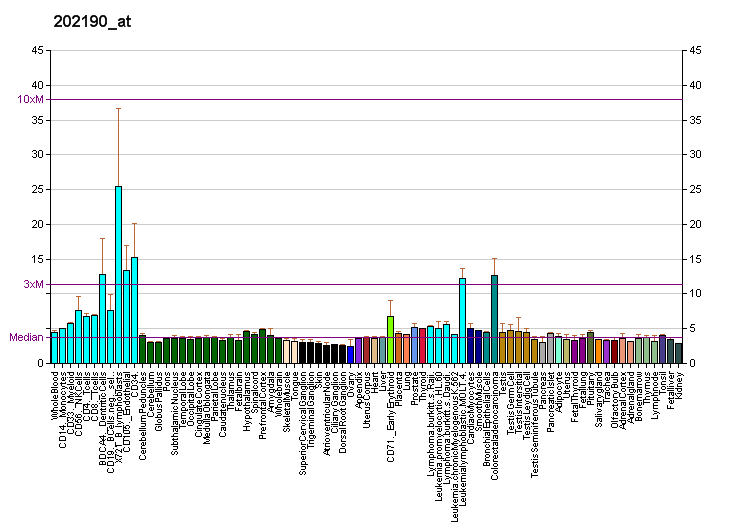

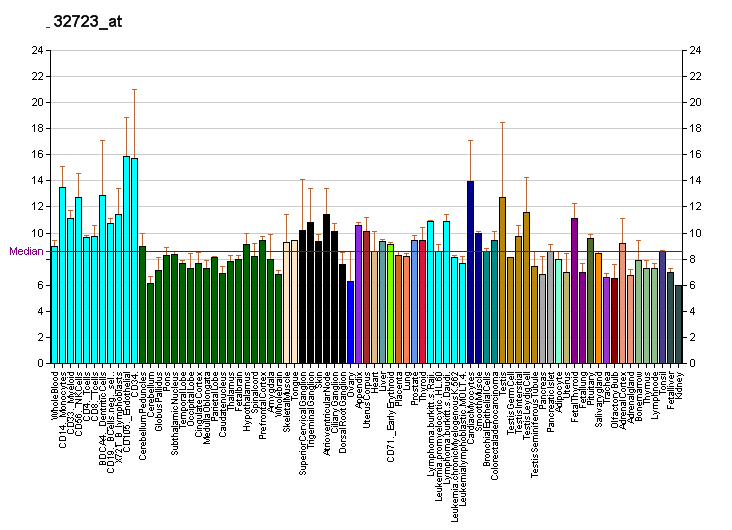
RNA expression pattern
Bgee	Human / Mouse (ortholog); Top expressed in: testicle; secondary oocyte; Achilles tendon; gonad; islet of Langerhans; stromal cell of endometrium; ventricular zone; rectum; granulocyte; body of pancreas / Top expressed in: spermatid; seminiferous tubule; spermatocyte; yolk sac; epiblast; ventricular zone; secondary oocyte; Ileal epithelium; tail of embryo; embryo; More reference expression data
BioGPS	More reference expression data
Gene ontology
Molecular function	protein binding; RNA binding
Cellular component	nucleus; nucleoplasm; mRNA cleavage stimulating factor complex
Biological process	mRNA splicing, via spliceosome; termination of RNA polymerase II transcription; mRNA processing; mRNA 3'-end processing
Sources:Amigo / QuickGO
Orthologs
Databases	NCBI: entry; OMA: entry
Species	Human	Mouse
Entrez	1477	67337
Ensembl	ENSG00000101138	ENSMUSG00000027498
UniProt	Q05048	Q99LC2
RefSeq (mRNA)	NM_001033521; NM_001033522; NM_001324	NM_024199
RefSeq (protein)	NP_001028693; NP_001028694; NP_001315	NP_077161
Location (UCSC)	Chr 20: 56.39 – 56.41 Mb	Chr 2: 172.21 – 172.22 Mb
PubMed search
- Wikidata
View/Edit Human	View/Edit Mouse

Cleavage stimulation factor 50 kDa subunit is a protein that in humans is encoded by the CSTF1 gene.

This gene encodes one of three subunits which combine to form cleavage stimulation factor (CSTF). CSTF is involved in the polyadenylation and 3' end cleavage of pre-mRNAs. Similar to mammalian G protein beta subunits, this protein contains transducin-like repeats. Several transcript variants with different 5' UTR, but encoding the same protein, have been found for this gene.

== Interactions ==
CSTF1 has been shown to interact with BARD1.
