= BRCC3 =

Protein-coding gene in humans

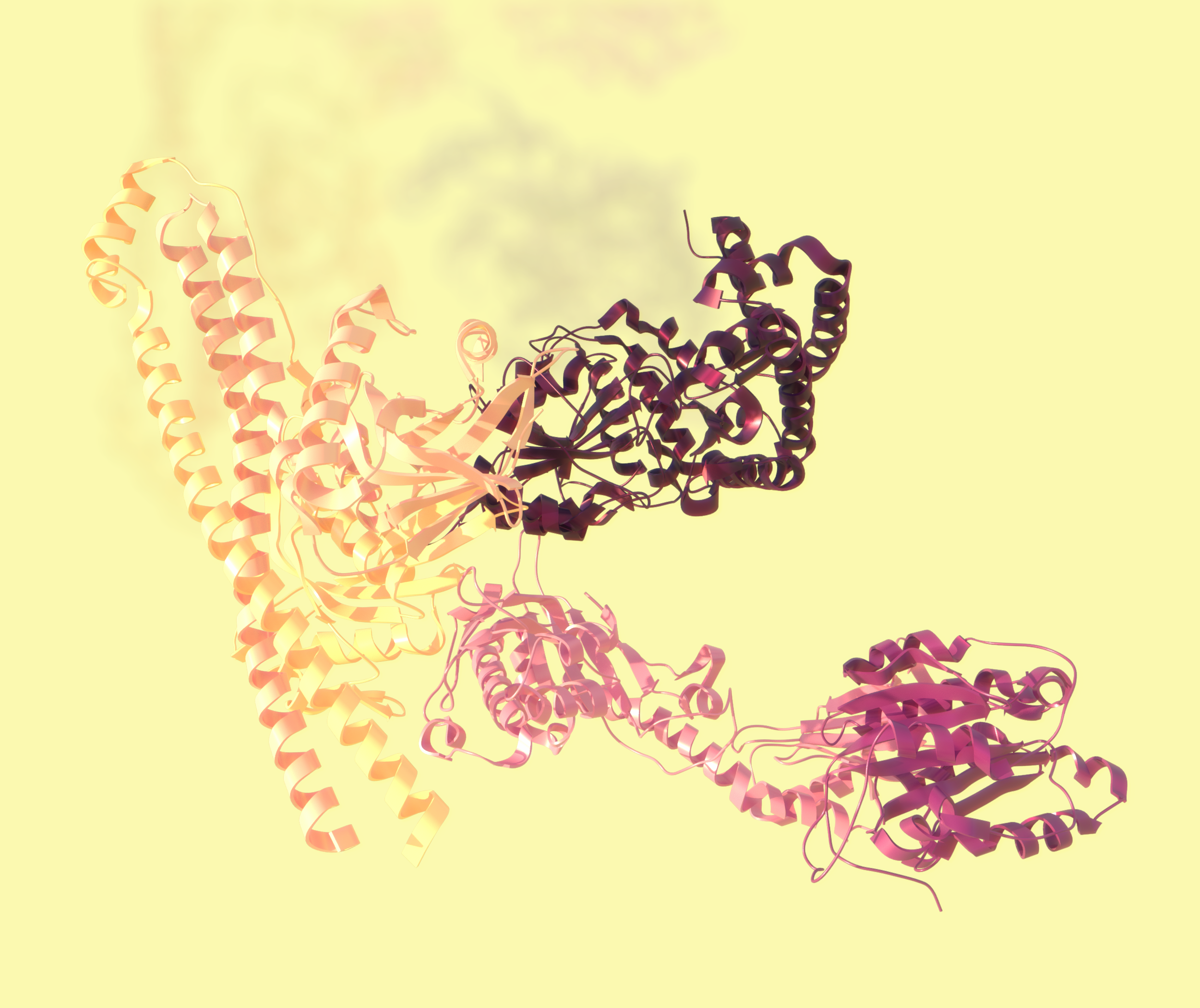

Identifiers
- Aliases: BRCC3, BRCC36, C6.1A, CXorf53, BRCA1/BRCA2-containing complex subunit 3
- External IDs: OMIM: 300617; MGI: 2389572; GeneCards: BRCC3

Gene location (Human)
Chr.	X chromosome (human)
Band	Xq28	Start	155,071,420 bp
Band	Xq28	End	155,123,077 bp

Gene location (Mouse)
Chr.	X chromosome (mouse)
Band	X|X A7.3	Start	74,460,234 bp
Band	X|X A7.3	End	74,497,607 bp
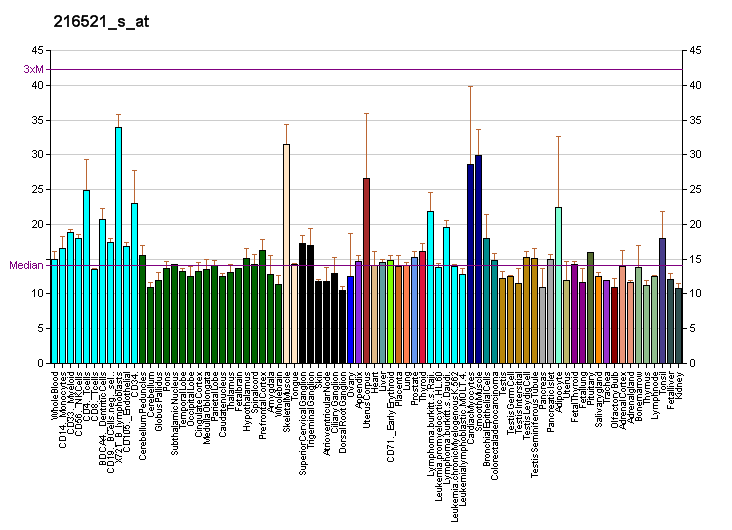

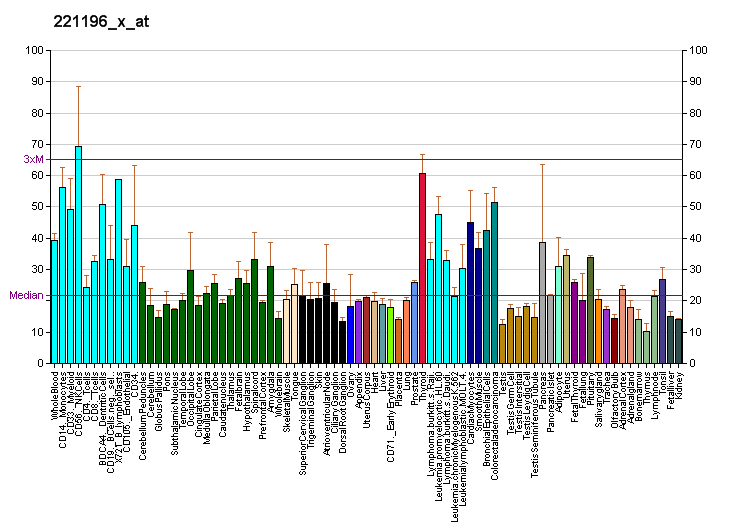
RNA expression pattern
Bgee	Human / Mouse (ortholog); Top expressed in: parotid gland; oral cavity; buccal mucosa cell; mucosa of sigmoid colon; corpus epididymis; biceps brachii; rectum; Skeletal muscle tissue of biceps brachii; bronchial epithelial cell; islet of Langerhans / Top expressed in: tail of embryo; genital tubercle; otic placode; primitive streak; gastrula; facial motor nucleus; medial vestibular nucleus; otic vesicle; submandibular gland; seminal vesicula; More reference expression data
BioGPS	More reference expression data
Gene ontology
Molecular function	enzyme regulator activity; metal ion binding; polyubiquitin modification-dependent protein binding; peptidase activity; protein binding; hydrolase activity; metallopeptidase activity; thiol-dependent deubiquitinase; Lys63-specific deubiquitinase activity
Cellular component	cytoplasm; spindle pole; nuclear ubiquitin ligase complex; ubiquitin ligase complex; nucleoplasm; cytoskeleton; nucleus; cytosol; BRCA1-A complex; BRISC complex
Biological process	response to ionizing radiation; positive regulation of DNA repair; proteolysis; cellular response to DNA damage stimulus; cell division; cell cycle; histone H2A K63-linked deubiquitination; double-strand break repair via nonhomologous end joining; response to X-ray; regulation of catalytic activity; double-strand break repair; DNA repair; protein deubiquitination; protein K63-linked deubiquitination; mitotic G2 DNA damage checkpoint signaling; chromatin organization
Sources:Amigo / QuickGO
Orthologs
Databases	NCBI: entry; OMA: entry
Species	Human	Mouse
Entrez	79184	210766
Ensembl	ENSG00000185515	ENSMUSG00000031201
UniProt	P46736	P46737
RefSeq (mRNA)	NM_001018055; NM_001242640; NM_024332	NM_001166457; NM_001166459; NM_145956; NM_001358736; NM_001358737
RefSeq (protein)	NP_001018065; NP_001229569; NP_077308	NP_001159929; NP_001159931; NP_666068; NP_001345665; NP_001345666
Location (UCSC)	Chr X: 155.07 – 155.12 Mb	Chr X: 74.46 – 74.5 Mb
PubMed search
- Wikidata
View/Edit Human	View/Edit Mouse

Lys-63-specific deubiquitinase BRCC36 is an enzyme that in humans is encoded by the BRCC3 gene.

== Function ==
This gene encodes a subunit of the BRCA1-BRCA2-containing complex (BRCC), which is an E3 ubiquitin ligase. This protein is also thought to be involved in the cellular response to ionizing radiation and progression through the G2/M checkpoint. Alternative splicing results in multiple transcript variants.

=== Repair of DNA damage ===
BRCC36, the protein product of the BRCC3 gene, is a deubiquitinating enzyme and a core component of the deubiquitin complex BRCA1-A. BRCA1, as distinct from BRCA1-A, is employed in the repair of chromosomal damage with an important role in the error-free homologous recombinational (HR) repair of DNA double-strand breaks. Sequestration of BRCA1 away from the DNA damage site suppresses homologous recombination and redirects the cell in the direction of repair by the process of non-homologous end joining (NHEJ). The role of BRCA1-A appears to be to bind BRCA1 with high affinity and withdraw it away from the site of DNA damage to the periphery where it remains sequestered, thus promoting DNA repair by NHEJ in preference to HR.

== Interactions ==
BRCC3 has been shown to interact with BRE, BRCA2, RAD51, BRCA1, P53 and BARD1.
