= CPSF1 =

Protein-coding gene in humans

Identifiers
- Aliases: CPSF1, CPSF160, HSU37012, P/cl.18, cleavage and polyadenylation specific factor 1
- External IDs: OMIM: 606027; MGI: 2679722; HomoloGene: 40865; GeneCards: CPSF1; OMA:CPSF1 - orthologs

Gene location (Human)
Chr.	Chromosome 8 (human)
Band	8q24.3	Start	144,393,229 bp
Band	8q24.3	End	144,409,349 bp

Gene location (Mouse)
Chr.	Chromosome 15 (mouse)
Band	15|15 D3	Start	76,480,003 bp
Band	15|15 D3	End	76,491,791 bp
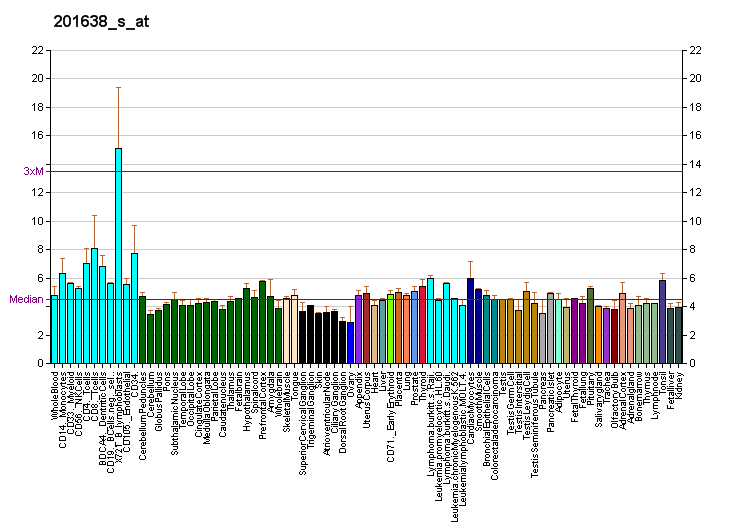

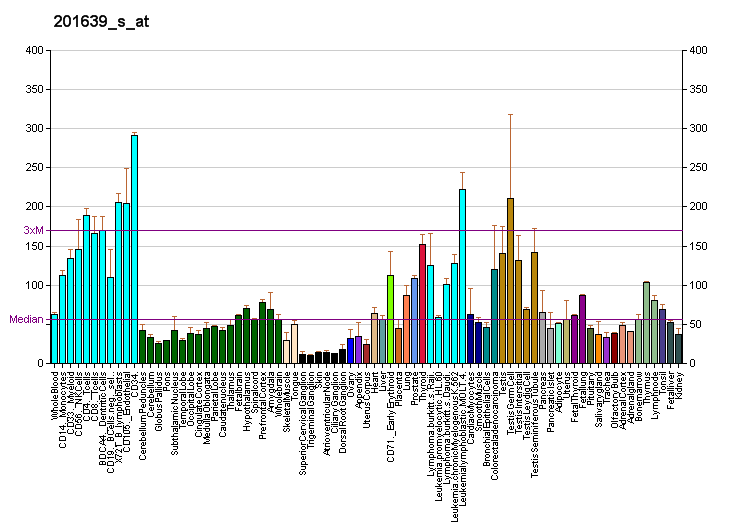

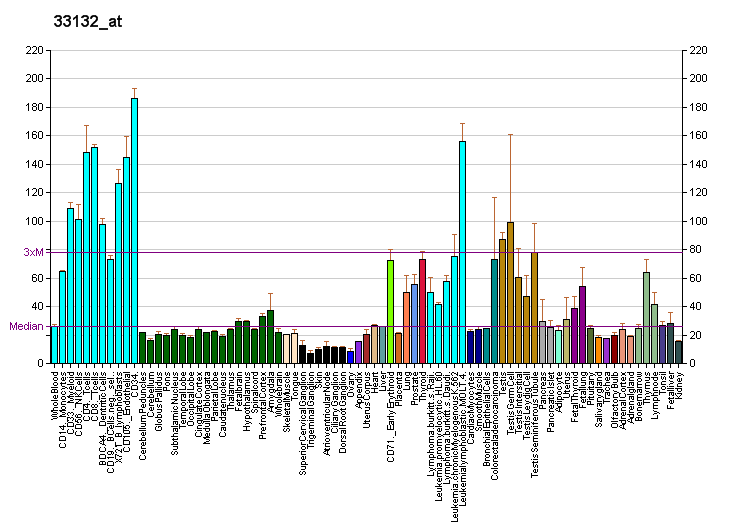
RNA expression pattern
Bgee	Human / Mouse (ortholog); Top expressed in: right testis; left testis; right hemisphere of cerebellum; right uterine tube; granulocyte; pituitary gland; anterior pituitary; duodenum; mucosa of transverse colon; spleen / Top expressed in: internal carotid artery; external carotid artery; hair follicle; primitive streak; vestibular membrane of cochlear duct; endothelial cell of lymphatic vessel; epiblast; neural layer of retina; ventricular zone; adrenal gland; More reference expression data
BioGPS	More reference expression data
Gene ontology
Molecular function	nucleic acid binding; enzyme binding; protein binding; mRNA 3'-UTR AU-rich region binding; RNA binding
Cellular component	mRNA cleavage and polyadenylation specificity factor complex; nucleus; nucleoplasm
Biological process	mRNA splicing, via spliceosome; termination of RNA polymerase II transcription; mRNA polyadenylation; mRNA processing; mRNA cleavage; mRNA 3'-end processing; mRNA export from nucleus; pre-mRNA cleavage required for polyadenylation; tRNA splicing, via endonucleolytic cleavage and ligation
Sources:Amigo / QuickGO
Orthologs
Species	Human	Mouse
Entrez	29894	94230
Ensembl	ENSG00000071894	ENSMUSG00000034022
UniProt	Q10570	Q9EPU4
RefSeq (mRNA)	NM_013291	NM_001164173; NM_053193; NM_001361485
RefSeq (protein)	NP_037423	NP_001157645; NP_444423; NP_001348414
Location (UCSC)	Chr 8: 144.39 – 144.41 Mb	Chr 15: 76.48 – 76.49 Mb
PubMed search
- Wikidata
View/Edit Human	View/Edit Mouse

Cleavage and polyadenylation specificity factor subunit 1 is a protein that in humans is encoded by the CPSF1 gene.

In most cases eukaryotic pre-messenger(m)RNA 3 prime ends are processed in two coordinated steps. First there is a site-specific cleavage by an endonuclease and then the addition of a poly(A) tail at the 3 prime end of the 5 prime cleavage product. Cleavage requires four multisubunit complexes, namely cleavage and polyadenylation specificity factor (CPSF), cleavage stimulation factor (CstF), cleavage factors Im and IIm (CFIm and CFIIm), along with a single subunit poly(A)polymerase (PAP). CPSF1 is the largest component of the CPSF complex composed of CPSF1, CPSF2, CPSF3, CPSF4, FIP1L1, Symplekin and WDR33 and located in the nucleus.
