= BNR/Asp-box repeat =

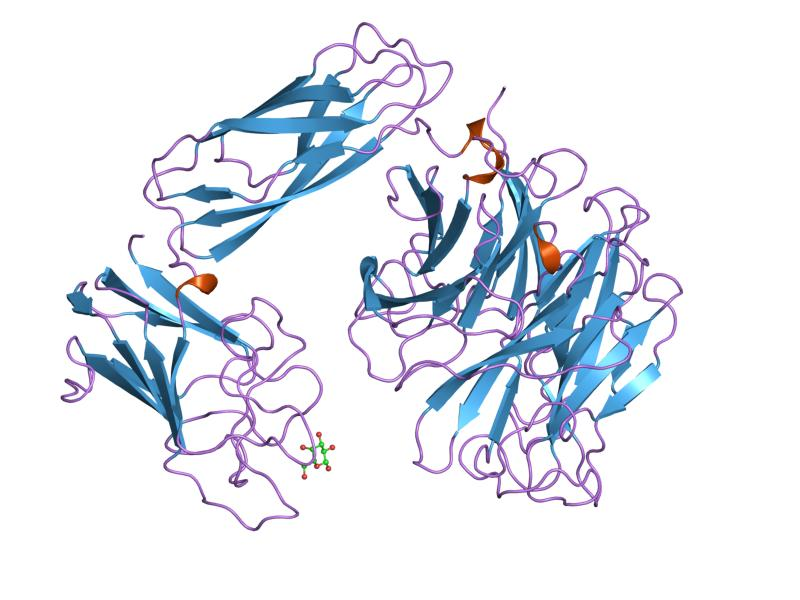
- Structure of a bacterial sialidase.

Identifiers
- Symbol: BNR
- Pfam: PF02012
- Pfam clan: CL0434
- InterPro: IPR002860
- SCOP2: 1euu / SCOPe / SUPFAM
Available protein structures:
- Pfam: structures / ECOD
- PDB: RCSB PDB; PDBe; PDBj
- PDBsum: structure summary

BNR/Asp-box repeat is a repetitive sequence of amino acids contained in some proteins. Many of these proteins contain multiple BNR (bacterial neuraminidase repeat) repeats or Asp-boxes.

The repeats are short, however the repeats are never found closer than 40 residues together suggesting that the repeat is structurally longer. The Asp-box itself adopts a well-defined beta-hairpin fold. These repeats are found in a variety of non-homologous proteins, including bacterial ribonucleases, sulphite oxidases, reelin, netrins, sialidases, neuraminidases, some lipoprotein receptors, and a variety of glycosyl hydrolases.

== Examples ==
Human genes encoding proteins containing this domain include:

- NEU1
- NEU2
- NEU3
- RELN
- SORCS1
- SORCS2
- SORCS3
- SORL1
- SORT1
