= CARASAL =

Cathepsin-A Related Arteriopathy with Strokes And Leukoencephalopathy
- Other names: CARASAL
- CARASAL is inherited in an autosomal dominant fashion.
- Symptoms: Migraine, mini-stroke, facial palsy, dementia, depression, concentration problems, movement problems, vertigo, difficulty swallowing, slurred speech, sicca symptoms, problems with REM sleep, drug-resistant hypertension
- Usual onset: 20s-40s
- Causes: Genetic mutation
- Diagnostic method: MRI, genetic testing
- Prognosis: Normal life expectancy

Cathepsin-A Related Arteriopathy with Strokes And Leukoencephalopathy (CARASAL) is a rare genetic disorder that is caused by mutation in a gene CTSA which is located on a chromosome 20. This disease is allelic to Galactosialidosis. This disease usually begins with a headache, decreased concentration, abnormalities in gait, lack of inhibition, also it usually presents with migraine, depression, vertigo and high blood pressure.

== Symptoms ==
The signs of this disease are: migraine, mini-stroke, facial palsy, dementia, depression, problems with concentration and movements, vertigo, difficulty in swallowing, slurring of speech, sicca symptoms, problems with REM sleep and drug-resistant hypertension.

This condition usually manifest in the third to fifth decades of life.

== Cause ==
CARASAL is caused by mutation of the CTSA which codes enzyme Cathespin A. CTSA gene is located on 20q13.12.

This disease is inherited in autosomal dominant fashion, which means that mutation of one gene copy is enough to cause the disorder.

According to some studies, the c.973C→T (p.R325C) mutation is associated with that disorder.

== Pathophysiology ==
Cathespin A is a lysosomal enzyme which main function is to form complex between β-galactosidase and Neurominidase 1 in lysosomes to protect them from degradation. Also it is known that Cathespin A degrades Endothelin-1 and consequently it is known that Endothelin-1 might cause inhibition of oligodendrocyte progenitor cell maturation and remyelination through reactive astrocytes mechanism.

As mentioned at the beginning of the article, CARASAL is allelic to Galactosialidosis, although Galactosialidosis is an autosomal recessive disorder.

== Diagnosis ==
CARASAL can be diagnosed by MRI investigation and by confirmation of the mutation in CTSA gene, also CARASAL should be considered in case of:

- Middle-age patients with Cerebral Small Vessel Disease (cSVD).
- Positive family history of stroke.
- Broad, unexplained, infra/supratentorial white and grey matter hyperintensities (a.k.a. bright signals on MRI image).
- Neurotological problems.

== Treatment ==
This disease doesn't have a cure, although symptomatic management is available.

== Prognosis ==
It is believed that life expectancy is similar to unaffected person.

== History ==
CARASAL was described in 5 French patients by Herve et al.

== See also ==
- CADASIL (Cerebral Autosomal Dominant Arteriopathy With Subcortical Infarcts And Leukoencephalopathy)
- CARASIL (Cerebral Autosomal Recessive Arteriopathy with Subcortical Infarcts and Leukoencephalopathy)
