= Anne Joutel =

French neurologist and medical geneticist

- Born: 20 March 1965; France
- Occupation(s): Neurology, Genetics
- Known for: Research into the genetic disease CADASIL
- Awards: The Brain Prize

Anne Joutel (born 1965) is a French neurologist and neuroscientist who is Research Director at the Institute of Psychiatry and Neurosciences of Paris. In 2019, together with three colleagues, she was awarded the Brain Prize, the largest prize awarded for brain research.

== Training ==
Joutel was born on 20 March 1965. She became a Doctor of Medicine at the Paris Diderot University in France, with a specialisation in neurology. Between 1993 and 1998 she was in residence in university hospitals in Paris. She received a PhD in neuroscience, from the Pierre and Marie Curie University, now the Sorbonne University, in 1996.

== Career ==
Joutel was appointed as a research officer at the Institut national de la santé et de la recherche médicale (French National Institute of Health and Medical Research - Inserm) in 1998. From 2000 she conducted research at the Lariboisière Hospital Faculty of Medicine, where she became the Director. She is currently the Research Director at the Institute of Psychiatry and Neuroscience of Paris, Paris Descartes University, which is now part of the University of Paris. The Institute consists of a multi-disciplinary team of over 150 neuroscientists and others working on neurodevelopment and psychiatry; the neurovascular system; multiscale imaging; translational neuroscience, and molecular and cellular mechanisms in the ageing brain.

Joutel studies the pathogenic mechanisms of small vessel diseases (SVD) of the brain. She has a long-standing interest in CADASIL (cerebral autosomal dominant arteriopathy with subcortical infarcts and leukoencephalopathy) and, as a PhD student, contributed to the identification of Notch 3, the genetic basis of CADASIL. She subsequently deciphered some of the key mechanisms driving cerebrovascular dysfunction. In partnership with the pharmaceutical company Lundbeck, she established the proof of concept of the therapeutic efficacy of passive immunization against Notch 3 in a pre-clinical CADASIL model. She now collaborates with Mark T. Nelson of the University of Vermont, USA as part of a Transatlantic Network of Excellence on the pathogenesis of cerebral SVD, funded by the Leducq Foundation. She also lectures at the University of Vermont.

== Honours and awards ==
Joutel has been in receipt of several distinguished awards:

- 2019 The Brain Prize (shared with Elisabeth Tournier-Lasserve, Hugues Chabriat and Marie-Germaine Bousser).
- 2001 Anita Harding Prize, European Society of Neurology
- 2000 Jean Valade Young Researcher Prize, Fondation de France
- 1997 Hélène Anavi Prize, Fondation Jean Dausset-CEPH
- 1996 Clara and Victor Soriano Prize, National Academy of Medicine

== Publications ==
Joutel has published numerous peer-reviewed articles, which are frequently cited. Those that are most cited, and for which she is a senior author are listed below:

- A Joutel, C Corpechot, A Ducros, K Vahedi, H Chabriat, P Mouton, et al. 1996. Notch3 mutations in CADASIL, a hereditary adult-onset condition causing stroke and dementia. Nature 383 (6602), 707-710. (2103 citations)
- H Chabriat, A Joutel, M Dichgans, E Tournier-Lasserve, MG Bousser. 2009. Cadasil. The Lancet Neurology 8 (7), 643–653. (961 citations)
- E Tournier-Lasserve, A Joutel, J Melki, J Weissenbach, GM Lathrop, et al. 1993. Cerebral autosomal dominant arteriopathy with subcortical infarcts and leukoencephalopathy maps to chromosome 19q12. Nature genetics 3 (3), 256–259. (729 citations)
- A Joutel, K Vahedi, C Corpechot, A Troesch, H Chabriat, C Vayssière, et al. Strong clustering and stereotyped nature of Notch3 mutations in CADASIL patients. 1997. The Lancet 350 (9090), 1511–1515. (683 citations)
- A Joutel, F Andreux, S Gaulis, V Domenga, M Cecillon, N Battail, N Piga, et al. 2000. The ectodomain of the Notch3 receptor accumulates within the cerebrovasculature of CADASIL patients. Journal of Clinical Investigation 105 (5), 597-605 (570 citations)
- A Joutel, MG Bousser, V Biousse, P Labauge, H Chabriat, A Nibbio, et al. 1993. A gene for familial hemiplegic migraine maps to chromosome 19. Nature genetics 5 (1), 40-45 (440 citations)
- A Joutel, M Monet-Leprêtre, C Gosele, C Baron-Menguy, A Hammes, et al. 2010. Cerebrovascular dysfunction and microcirculation rarefaction precede white matter lesions in a mouse genetic model of cerebral ischemic small vessel disease. The Journal of clinical investigation 120 (2), 433–445. (296 citations)
- A Joutel, P Favrole, P Labauge, H Chabriat, C Lescoat, F Andreux. 2001. Skin biopsy immunostaining with a Notch3 monoclonal antibody for CADASIL diagnosis. The Lancet 358 (9298), 2049–2051. (273 citations)
