= CADASIL =

Genetic disorder

- Other names: CADASIL syndrome
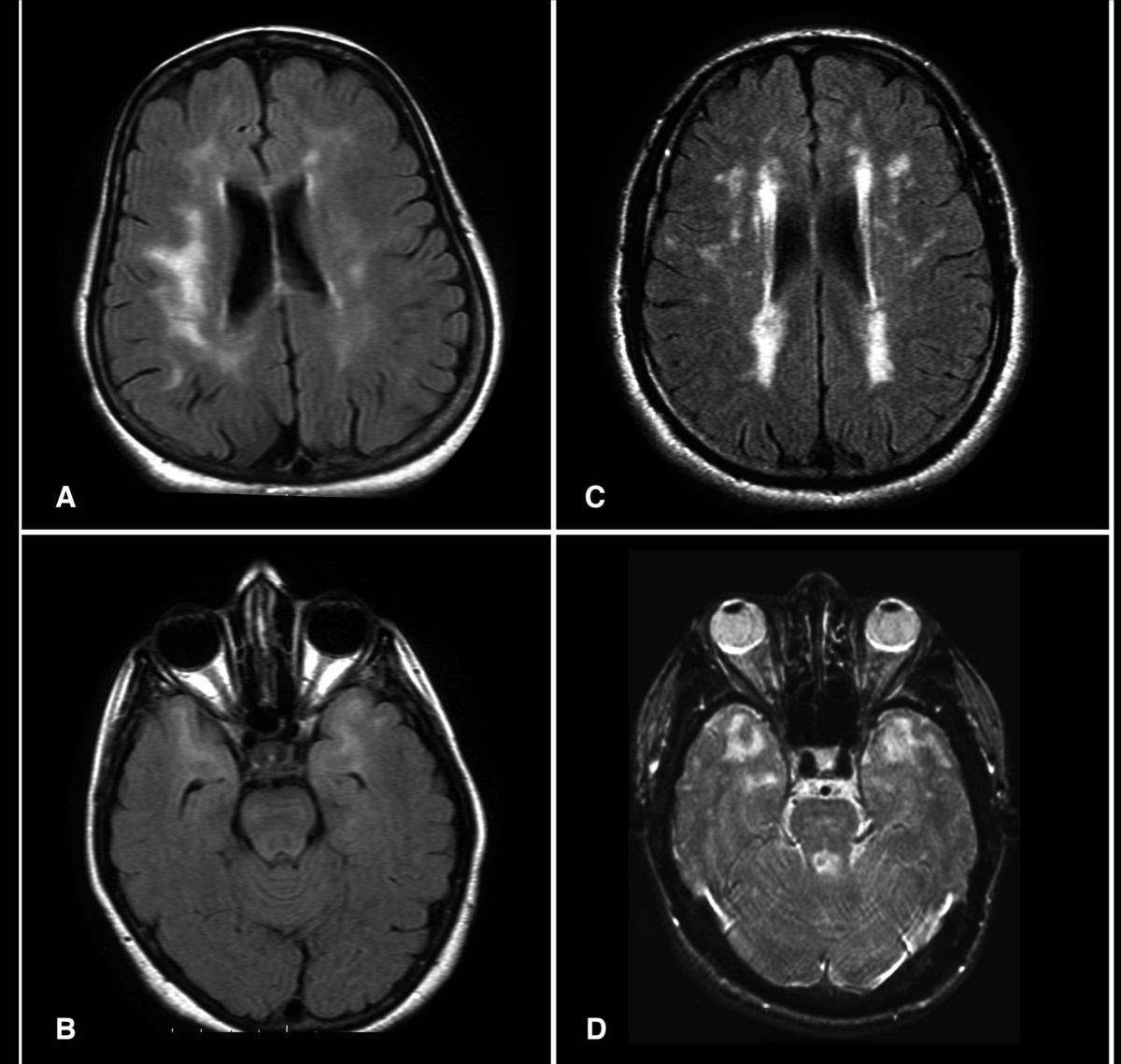
- Brain MRI from patients with CADASIL showing multiple lesions.
- Specialty: Neurology, medical genetics
- Symptoms: Migraine headaches
- Frequency: 0.00198%, 0.005%

CADASIL or CADASIL syndrome, involving cerebral autosomal dominant arteriopathy with subcortical infarcts and leukoencephalopathy, is the most common form of hereditary stroke disorder and is thought to be caused by mutations of the NOTCH3 gene on chromosome 19. The disease belongs to a family of disorders called the leukodystrophies. The most common clinical manifestations are migraine headaches and transient ischemic attacks or strokes, which usually occur between 40 and 50 years of age, although MRI is able to detect signs of the disease years prior to clinical manifestation of disease.

The condition was identified and named by French researchers Marie-Germaine Bousser and Elisabeth Tournier-Lasserve in the 1990s. Together with two other researchers, Hugues Chabriat and Anne Joutel, they received the 2019 Brain Prize for their research into the condition.

== Signs and symptoms ==
CADASIL may start with attacks of migraine with aura or subcortical transient ischemic attacks or strokes, or mood disorders between 35 and 55 years of age. The disease progresses to subcortical dementia associated with pseudobulbar palsy and urinary incontinence.

Ischemic strokes are the most frequent presentation of CADASIL, with approximately 85% of symptomatic individuals developing transient ischemic attacks or stroke(s). The mean age of onset of ischemic episodes is approximately 46 years (range 30–70). A classic lacunar syndrome occurs in at least two-thirds of affected patients while hemispheric strokes are much less common. It is worthy of note that ischemic strokes typically occur in the absence of traditional cardiovascular risk factors. Recurrent silent strokes, with or without clinical strokes, often lead to cognitive decline and overt subcortical dementia. A case of CADASIL presenting as schizophreniform organic psychosis has been reported.

== Pathophysiology ==
The underlying pathology of CADASIL is progressive hypertrophy of the smooth muscle cells in blood vessels. Autosomal dominant mutations in the NOTCH3 gene (on the long arm of chromosome 19) cause an abnormal accumulation of Notch 3 protein at the cytoplasmic membrane of vascular smooth muscle cells both in cerebral and extracerebral vessels, seen as granular osmiophilic deposits on electron microscopy. Leukoencephalopathy follows. Depending on the nature and position of each mutation, a consensus significant loss of beta sheet structure of the Notch3 protein has been predicted using in silico analysis.

== Diagnosis ==
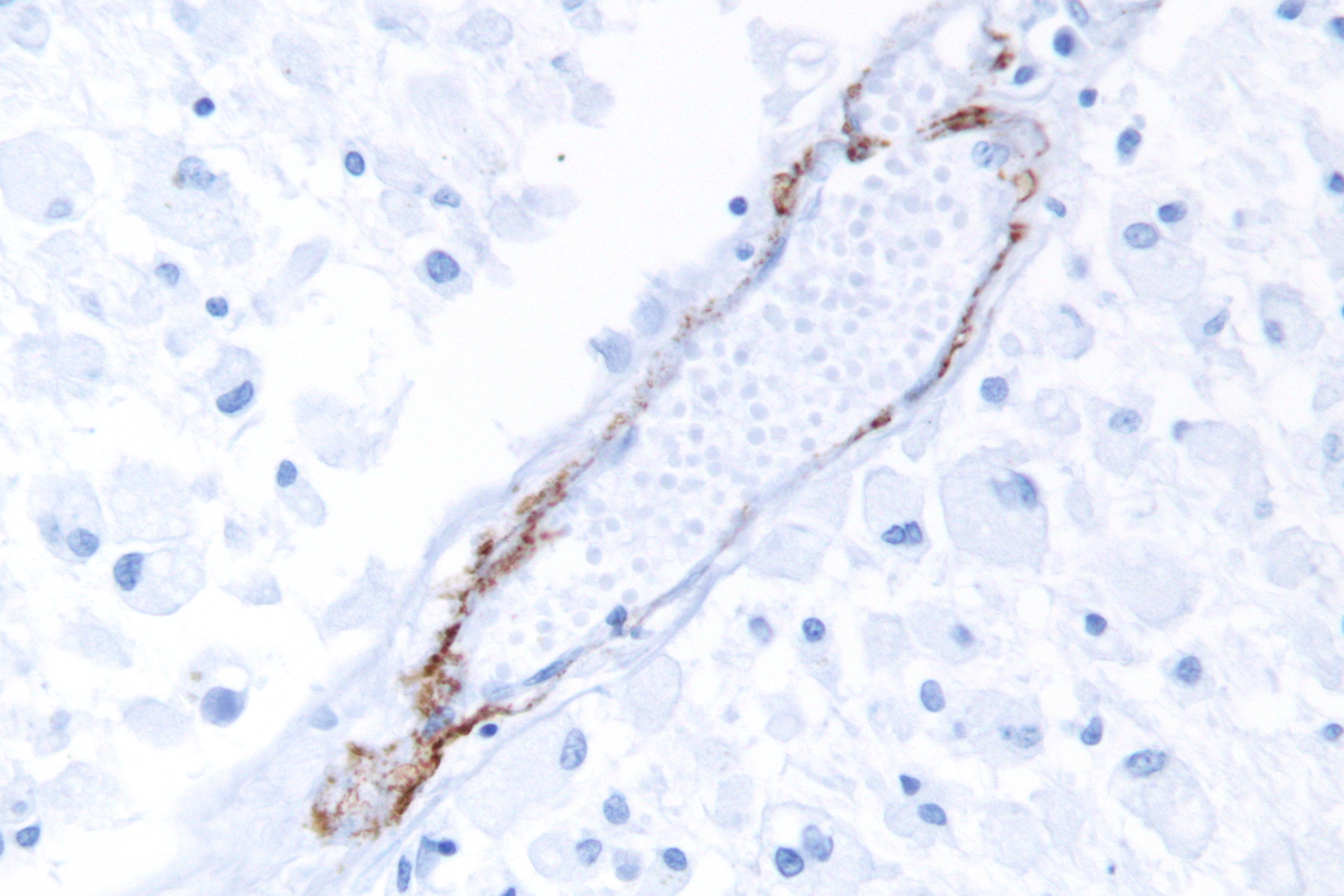
A micrograph showing punctate immunostaining (brown) with a Notch 3 antibody, as is characteristic in CADASIL.

MRIs show hypointensities on T1-weighted images and hyperintensities on T2-weighted images, usually multiple confluent white matter lesions of various sizes, are characteristic. These lesions are concentrated around the basal ganglia, peri-ventricular white matter and the pons and are similar to those seen in Binswanger disease. These white matter lesions are also seen in asymptomatic individuals with the mutated gene. While MRI is not used to diagnose CADASIL, it can show the progression of white matter changes even decades before onset of symptoms.

The definitive test is sequencing the whole NOTCH3 gene, which can be done from a sample of blood. However, as this is quite expensive and CADASIL is a systemic arterial disease, evidence of the mutation can be found in small and medium-size arteries. Therefore, skin biopsies are often used for the diagnosis.

== Treatment ==
No specific treatment for CADASIL is available. While most treatments for CADASIL patients' symptoms – including migraine and stroke – are similar to those without CADASIL, these treatments are almost exclusively empiric, as data regarding their benefit to CADASIL patients are limited. Antiplatelet agents such as aspirin, dipyridamole, or clopidogrel might help prevent strokes; however, anticoagulation may be inadvisable given the propensity for microhemorrhages. Control of high blood pressure is particularly important in CADASIL patients. Short-term use of atorvastatin, a statin-type cholesterol-lowering medication, has not been shown to be beneficial in CADASIL patients' cerebral hemodynamic parameters, although treatment of comorbidities such as high cholesterol is recommended. Stopping oral contraceptive pills may be recommended. Some authors advise against the use of triptan medications for migraine treatment, given their vasoconstrictive effects, although this sentiment is not universal. In this regard, the advent of the "Ditans" such as Lasmiditan, lacking vasoconstrictive effect and the "Gepants" such as Ubrogepant and Rimegepant, are attractive alternatives, albeit not yet field-tested in this condition. As with other individuals, people with CADASIL should be encouraged to quit smoking.

In one small study, around 1/3 of patients with CADASIL were found to have cerebral microhemorrhages (tiny areas of old blood) on MRI.

L-arginine, a naturally occurring amino acid, has been proposed as a potential therapy for CADASIL, but as of 2017 there are no clinical studies supporting its use. Donepezil, normally used for Alzheimer's Disease, was shown not to improve executive functioning in CADASIL patients.

== Society and culture ==
John Ruskin has been suggested to have had CADASIL. Ruskin reported in his diaries having visual disturbances consistent with the disease and it has also been suggested that it might have been a factor in causing him to describe James Whistler's Nocturne in Black and Gold – The Falling Rocket as "ask[ing] two hundred guineas for throwing a pot of paint in the public's face". This resulted in the famous libel trial that resulted in a jury's awarding Whistler one farthing damages.

Recent research into the illness of philosopher Friedrich Nietzsche has suggested that his mental illness and death may have been caused by CADASIL rather than tertiary syphilis. Likewise, the early death of the composer Felix Mendelssohn, at age 37, from a stroke has been potentially linked to CADASIL. His sister, Fanny Hensel, was similarly affected. And James Dewar, best known as vocalist for Robin Trower, died age 59 from complications of CADASIL.

In the movie The Sea Inside, one of the characters is stated to have CADASIL.

In the Netflix 2023 limited series The Fall of the House of Usher, the main character Roderick Usher has a CADASIL diagnosis and much of the series storyline surrounds his criminal and illicit attempts to find a cure. The limited series is based on the life's work of Edgar Allan Poe.

== See also ==
- Proteopathy
- CARASIL (Cerebral Autosomal Recessive Arteriopathy with Subcortical Infarcts and Leukoencephalopathy)
- CARASAL (Cathepsin-A Related Arteriopathy with Strokes And Leukoencephalopathy)
