= Cathepsin A =

Enzyme known as Human Protective Protein

CTSA
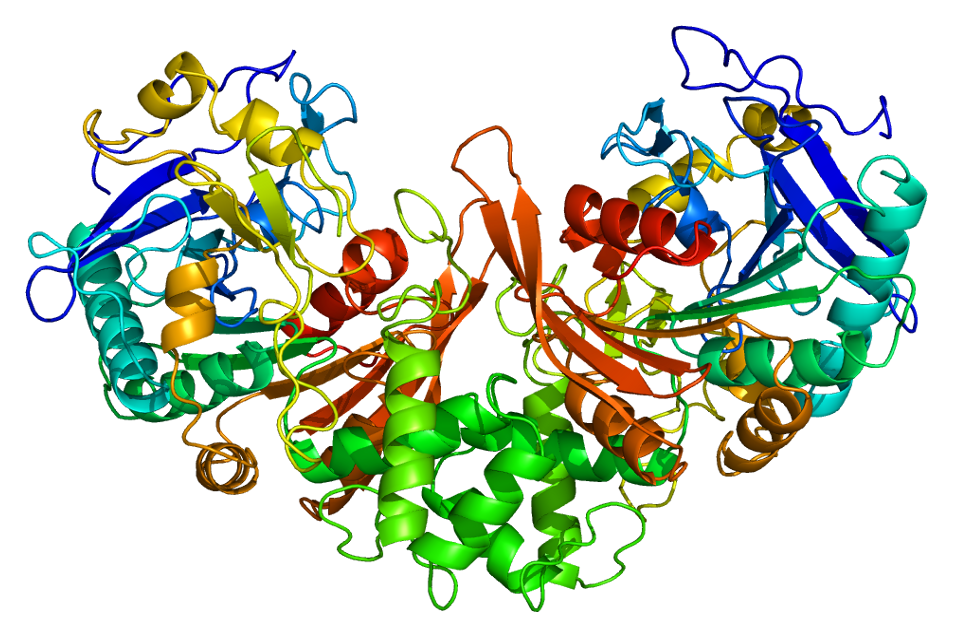

Identifiers
- Aliases: CTSA, GLB2, GSL, NGBE, PPCA, PPGB, cathepsin A
- External IDs: OMIM: 613111; MGI: 97748; GeneCards: CTSA
Available structures
PDB	Ortholog search: PDBe RCSB
PDB	List of PDB id codes 1IVY, 3BP4, 3BP7, 3BXN, 4AZ0, 4AZ3, 4CI9, 4CIA, 4CIB, 4MWS, 4MWT
Enzyme activity
EC #	BRENDA	ExPASy	KEGG	MetaCyc
3.4.16.5	↗	↗	↗	↗

Gene location (Human)
Chr.	Chromosome 20 (human)
Band	20q13.12	Start	45,890,144 bp
Band	20q13.12	End	45,898,949 bp

Gene location (Mouse)
Chr.	Chromosome 2 (mouse)
Band	2 H3|2 85.27 cM	Start	164,674,793 bp
Band	2 H3|2 85.27 cM	End	164,682,952 bp
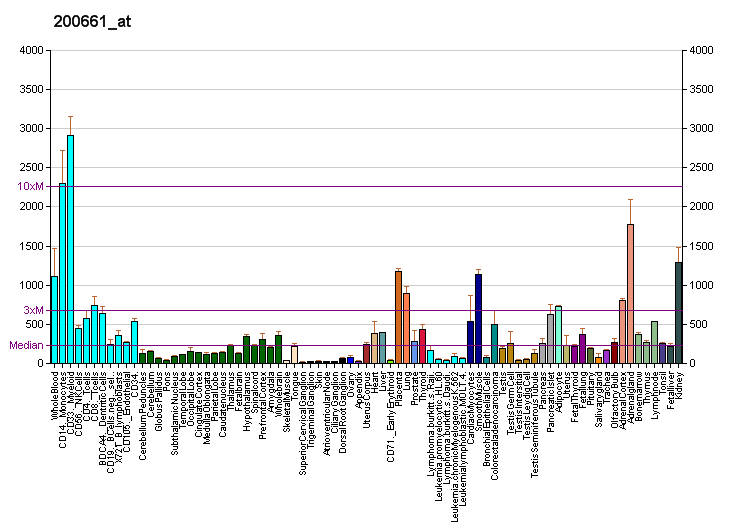
RNA expression pattern
Bgee	Human / Mouse (ortholog); Top expressed in: right adrenal gland; right adrenal cortex; left adrenal gland; left adrenal cortex; mucosa of transverse colon; stromal cell of endometrium; monocyte; rectum; human kidney; gallbladder / Top expressed in: stroma of bone marrow; decidua; calvaria; lip; right kidney; yolk sac; vestibular sensory epithelium; proximal tubule; skin of external ear; uterus; More reference expression data
BioGPS	More reference expression data
Gene ontology
Molecular function	peptidase activity; carboxypeptidase activity; enzyme activator activity; hydrolase activity; exo-alpha-sialidase activity; serine-type carboxypeptidase activity
Cellular component	membrane; intracellular membrane-bounded organelle; nucleoplasm; lysosomal lumen; endoplasmic reticulum; lysosome; lumenal side of lysosomal membrane; extracellular exosome; extracellular region; azurophil granule lumen
Biological process	regulation of protein stability; glycosphingolipid metabolic process; proteolysis; regulation of chaperone-mediated autophagy; proteolysis involved in cellular protein catabolic process; intracellular protein transport; positive regulation of catalytic activity; neutrophil degranulation; negative regulation of chaperone-mediated autophagy
Sources:Amigo / QuickGO
Orthologs
Databases	NCBI: entry; OMA: entry
Species	Human	Mouse
Entrez	5476	19025
Ensembl	ENSG00000064601	ENSMUSG00000017760
UniProt	P10619	P16675
RefSeq (mRNA)	NM_001167594; NM_000308; NM_001127695	NM_001038492; NM_008906
RefSeq (protein)	NP_000299; NP_001121167; NP_001161066	NP_001033581; NP_032932
Location (UCSC)	Chr 20: 45.89 – 45.9 Mb	Chr 2: 164.67 – 164.68 Mb
PubMed search
- Wikidata
View/Edit Human	View/Edit Mouse

Cathepsin A is an enzyme that is classified both as a cathepsin and a carboxypeptidase. In humans, it is encoded by the CTSA gene. The enzyme is also known as Human Protective Protein. It is a lysosomal serine carboxypeptidase. The enzyme is a zymogen and must be processed to produce a 32 kDa and 20 kDa large and small subunit, respectively, to become catalytically active. Cathespin L can activate Cathepsin A in vitro.

== Structure ==
Cathepsin A contains a large and small subunit. The active site contains unusual pairs of carboxylic acids hydrogen bonded to one another, sometimes referred to as "Rebek pairs".

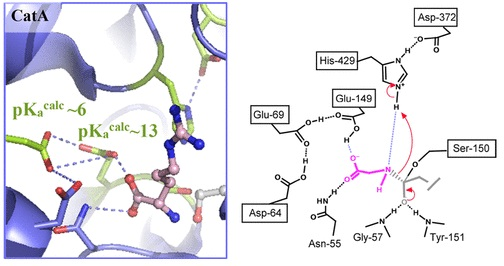
Active site of Cathepsin A. In green is the Rebek pair. The two glutamate side chains are directed towards one another. To prevent an unfavorable charge-charge interaction the pKa of one glutamate side chain is raised to ~13.

The pairing of these carboxylic acids raises the pKa of one glutamate to ~13 while the other has a predicted pKa of ~6.

== Function ==
This gene encodes a glycoprotein that associates with lysosomal enzymes beta-galactosidase and neuraminidase to form a complex of high-molecular-weight multimers. The formation of this complex provides a protective role for stability and activity. It is protective for β-galactosidase and neuraminidase.

== Substrates ==
CTSA is part of the Renin Angiotensin System (RAS). Substrates of the enzyme that have been identified in vitro include endothelin I, angiotensin I, bradykinin, Substance P, and oxytocin.

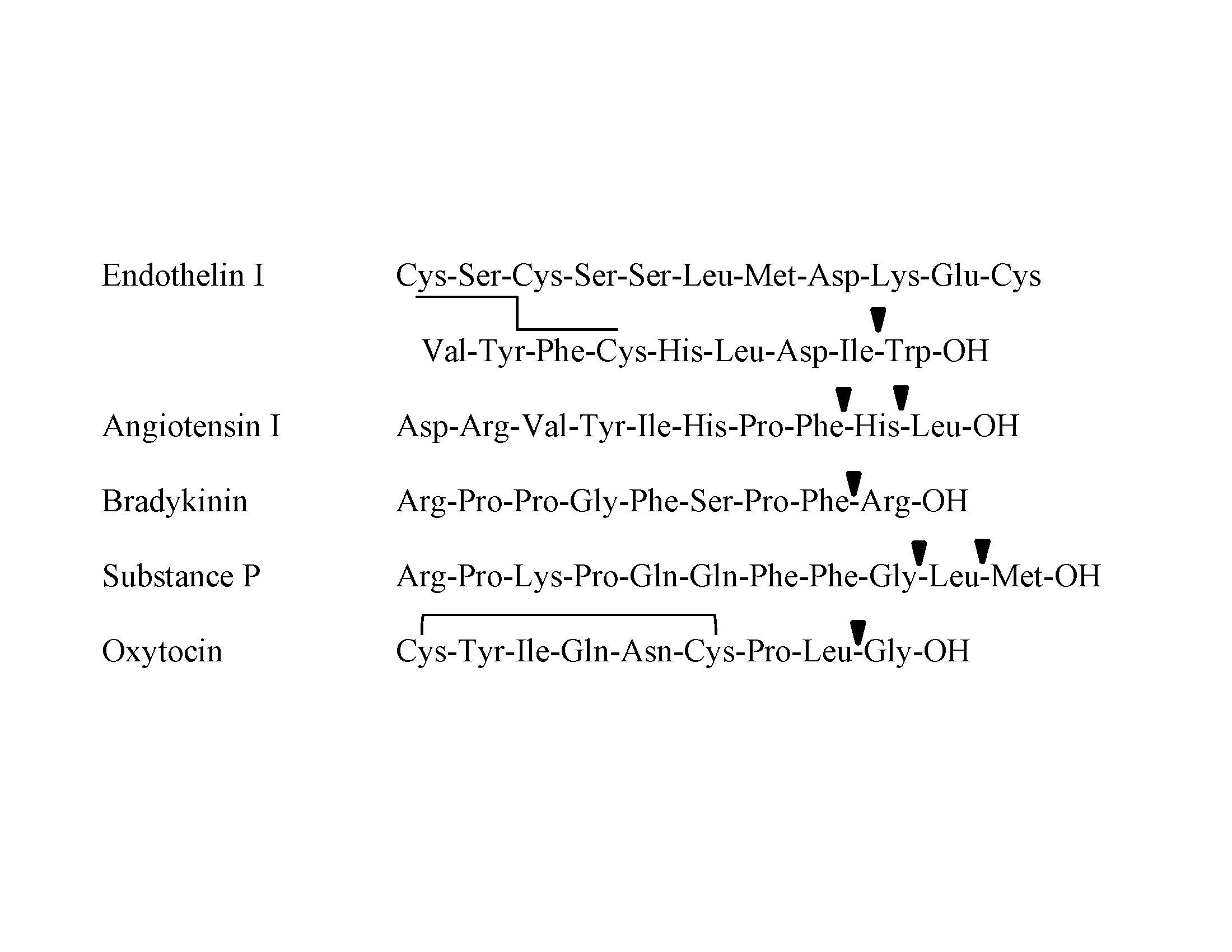
Peptide substrates of Cathepsin A. CTSA is part of the Renin-Angiotensin System (RAS)

== Inhibition ==
Cathepsin A is one of 14 human enzymes commonly inhibited by organophosphate pesticides and phosphonate nerve agents. Cathepsin A can be inhibited by sarin, soman, cyclosarin, VX, and VR. After inhibition, it undergoes aging. The enzyme can be found in urine and blood.

== Clinical significance ==
Deficiencies in this gene are linked to multiple forms of galactosialidosis and CARASAL.

== Interactions ==
Cathepsin A has been shown to interact with NEU1 and GLB1.
