= Mark L. Kahn =

American cardiologist

- Education: Brown University (A.B.); Alpert Medical School (M.D.)
- Scientific career
- Fields: Cardiology
- Workplaces: Perelman School of Medicine

Mark L. Kahn is a cardiologist currently serving as the Edward S. Cooper, M.D./Norman Roosevelt and Elizabeth Meriwether McLure Professor of Medicine at the Perelman School of Medicine at the University of Pennsylvania. At Penn, Kahn additionally serves as Director of Center for Vascular Biology and Director of Molecular Cardiology.

Kahn received a bachelor of arts in Biology from Brown University in 1984 and a medical degree from Brown's Alpert Medical School in 1987.

In 2011, Kahn received a $6 million grant from the Leducq Foundation to investigate lymphatic vascular defects and their contribution to cardiovascular diseases. Kahn's laboratory researches the role of signaling pathways in cardiovascular development and function. In 2017, research published by the lab linked intestinal bacteria to the structure of brain blood vessel.

In 2004, Kahn was elected a member of the American Society for Clinical Investigation.
