= Leukoaraiosis =

Type of white matter abnormality near the lateral ventricles

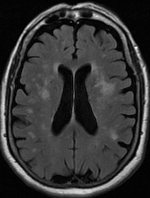
Axial T2 FLAIR sequence MR image of a middle-aged man with leukoaraiosis.

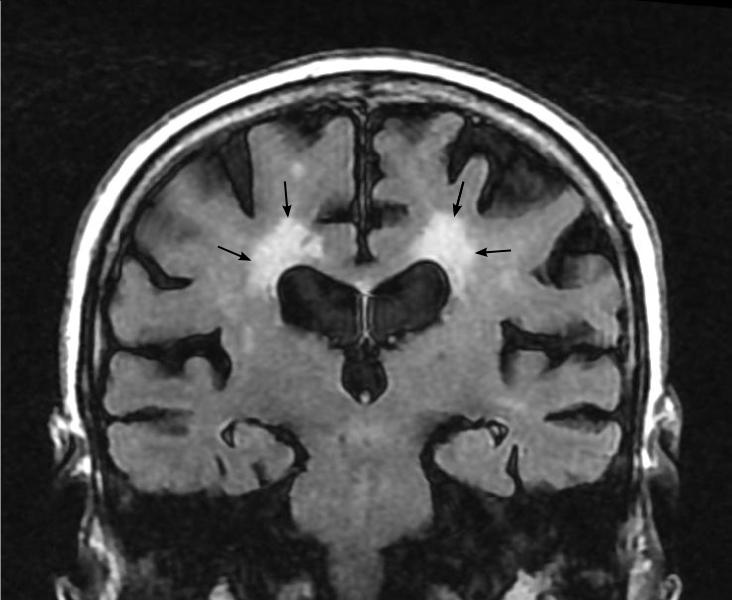
MRI image: Leukoaraiosis in a 90-year-old patient with cerebral atrophy.

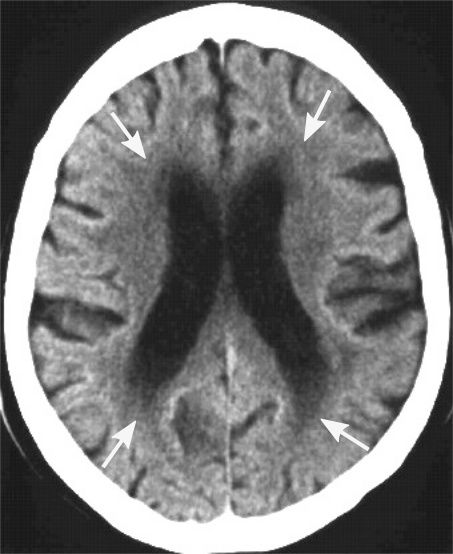
Head CT showing periventricular white matter lesions.

Leukoaraiosis is a particular abnormal change in appearance of white matter near the lateral ventricles. It is often seen in aged individuals, but sometimes in young adults. On MRI, leukoaraiosis changes appear as white matter hyperintensities (WMHs) in T2 FLAIR images. On CT scans, leukoaraiosis appears as hypodense periventricular white-matter lesions.

== Causes ==
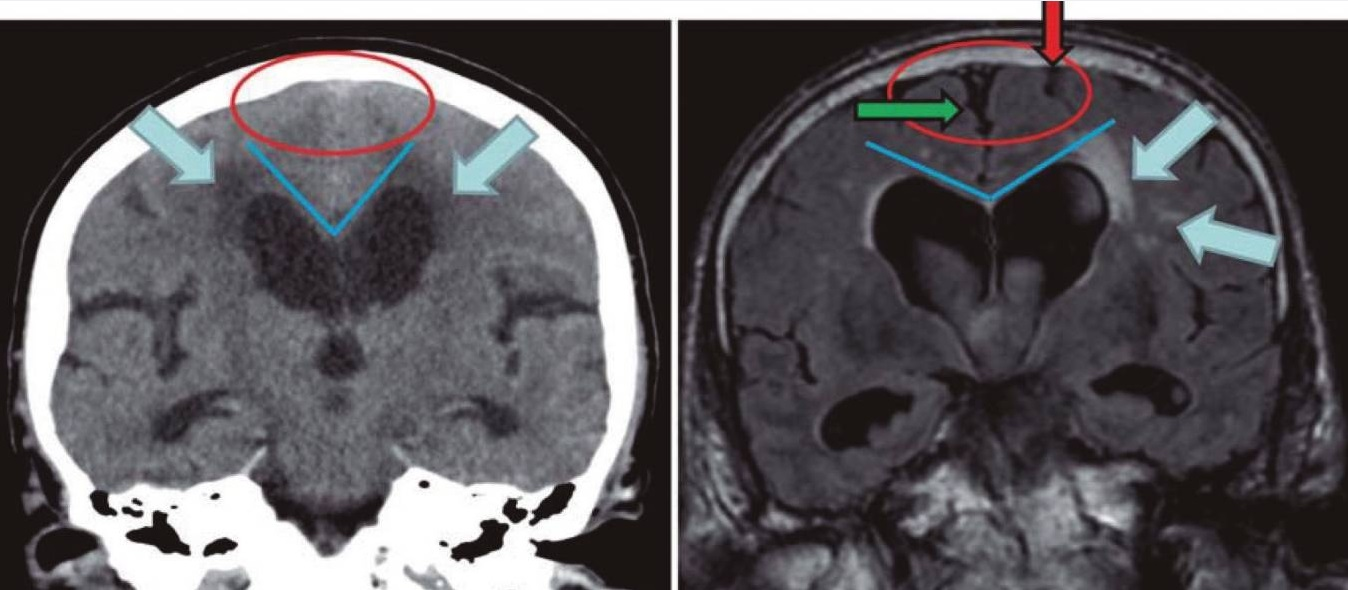
The blue arrows indicate leucoaraiosis. In the left image these may well represent transependymal CSF diapedesis due to normal pressure hydrocephalus, which in turn is suggested by the narrowed superior CSF spaces and acute callosal angle. The unilateral occurrence of these alterations in right image suggests they are probably due to vascular encephalopathy.

White matter hyperintensities can be caused by a variety of factors, including ischemia, micro-hemorrhages, gliosis, damage to small blood vessel walls, breaches of the barrier between the cerebrospinal fluid and the brain, or loss and deformation of the myelin sheath. Multiple small vessel infarcts in the subcortical white matter can cause the condition, often the result of chronic hypertension leading to lipohyalinosis of the small vessels. Patients may develop cognitive impairment and dementia.

Many patients can have leukoaraiosis without any associated clinical abnormality. However, underlying vascular mechanisms are suspected to be the cause of the imaging findings. Hypertension, smoking, diabetes, hyperhomocysteinemia, and heart diseases are all risk factors for leukoaraiosis.

Leukoaraiosis has been reported to be an initial stage of Binswanger's disease but this evolution does not always happen.

== Special cases ==
- Ischaemic leukoaraiosis has been defined as the leukoaraiosis present after a stroke.
- Diabetes-associated leukoaraiosis has been reported
- CuRRL syndrome: increased Cup: Disc Ratio, Retinal GanglionCell Complex thinning, Radial Peripapillary Capillary Network Density Reduction and Leukoaraiosis
- CADASIL is a hereditary cerebrovascular disorder associated with T2-hyperintense white matter lesions that have a greater extent and earlier age of onset than age-related leukoaraiosis.

== See also ==
- Hyperintensities
- Binswanger's disease
- Demyelinating disease
