= CARASIL =

Cerebral autosomal recessive arteriopathy with subcortical infarcts and leukoencephalopathy
- Other names: Maeda syndrome
- CARASIL is autosomal recessive.

Cerebral autosomal recessive arteriopathy with subcortical infarcts and leukoencephalopathy (CARASIL) is disease of the arteries in the brain, which causes tissue loss in the subcortical region of the brain and the destruction of myelin in the CNS. CARASIL is characterized by symptoms such as gait disturbances, hair loss, low back pain, dementia, and stroke. CARASIL is a rare disease, having only been diagnosed in about 50 patients, of which ten have been genetically confirmed. Most cases have been reported in Japan, but Chinese and caucasian individuals have also been diagnosed with the disease. CARASIL is inherited in an autosomal recessive pattern. There is currently no cure for CARASIL. Other names for CARASIL include familial young-adult-onset arteriosclerotic leukoencephalopathy with alopecia and lumbago without arterial hypertension, Nemoto disease and Maeda syndrome.

== Signs and symptoms ==
Symptoms of CARASIL may include spondylosis deformans, lumbago (lower back pain) due to herniated disks, alopecia, spasticity in the limbs leading to gait disturbances, dysarthria, urinary incontinence, pseudobulbular signs, arteriosclerosis of cerebral arteries, mood changes, stroke, and dementia.

Individuals with CARASIL may experience spondylosis and alopecia beginning in their teens, although alopecia is not seen in all patients. Other signs of the disease, particularly neurological abnormalities, may present from ages 20–40 with symptoms worsening over time. About 50% of affected patients present with stroke, and most strokes experienced by patients are lacunar infarcts. Many patients experience some form of mood changes, personality disorders, and/or dementia over time.

== Cause ==
CARASIL is caused by mutation of the HTRA1 gene which encodes the HtrA serine peptidase 1 protein (HTRA1). HTRA1 is located on chromosome 10 and encodes an enzyme that regulates signaling by the TGF-β family of proteins. TGF-β protein family plays an important role in cellular functions, especially in angiogenesis. Individuals with CARASIL have mutations in HTRA1 which leads to a reduced amount of HTRA1 protein or no HTRA1 protein at all. The mutant proteins are unable to suppress TGF-β activity. Increase in TGF-β1 activity has been seen in the tunica media of affected small arteries.

CARASIL is an autosomal recessive disease, meaning that both parents must be a carrier for the allele in order for the disease to be passed on to the child. As with other autosomal recessive diseases, the likelihood of receiving a recessive allele from both parents increases if the parents are closely related to each other (consanguineous). This trend has been observed for CARASIL.

== Pathophysiology ==
A few different types of mutations to the HTRA1 gene have been observed in CARASIL patients. Nonsense mutations have been shown to cause no HTRA1 protein to be produced, while missense mutations have been shown to produce some HTRA1 protein, but with reduced activity. Regardless of whether or not HTRA1 protein is produced, or its activity is greatly reduced, the normal regulatory activity of the HTRA1 protein is lost. This means that TGF-β (transforming growth factor beta) signaling cannot be repressed as normal. When TGF-β activity goes unchecked, it alters the structure of the small blood vessels in the brain, increasing an individual's risk of stroke and other neurological abnormalities. Abnormally increased TGF-β activity is also suspected to be involved in the alopecia and lumbago seen in CARASIL patients, but that has not been confirmed and the mechanism is not yet known.

CARASIL is a disease characterized by damage to the small blood vessels of the brain. When blood vessels in the brain are damaged, blood flow can be reduced or stopped leading to stroke. It can also lead to a variety of different symptoms depending on what area of the brain has lost its blood supply. This is what causes the spasticity in the limbs, slurred speech, urinary incontinence, and dysarthria seen in some patients.

Progressive damage to and loss of the white matter, or myelinated areas, in the brain leads to some of the other neurological symptoms, such as forgetfulness progressing to dementia, mood changes, confusion, and apathy.

== Diagnosis ==
CARASIL can be tentatively diagnosed by a thorough medical history, examination of symptoms, differential diagnoses, and MRI scans of the brain. Diffuse white matter changes (leukoencephalopathy) and multiple lacunar infarcts in the basal ganglia of the thalamus are usually determining factors seen on MRI scans of affected individuals. Further genetic testing must be used to confirm the diagnosis.

It is suspected that there are many cases of CARASIL that have not been diagnosed because of the similarities with other neurological disorders. Several disease that are frequently used for differential diagnoses include Binswanger's disease, CADASIL, Nasu-Hakola disease, and chronic progressive multiple sclerosis.

== Treatment ==
There is currently no treatment or cure for CARASIL. Most frequently, a combination of supportive care and medications to prevent the occurrence of stroke are recommended. Counseling or other forms of emotional support may be beneficial to both patients and family members. Medications or therapies may be used to treat specific symptoms of the disease. Tizanidine and baclofen may be used to treat the spasticity of the limbs. A walker or cane may be used to assist individuals with gait disturbances. Anxiolytics may be prescribed for mood changes.

== Prognosis ==
The prognosis for individuals with CARASIL is progressive neurological decline over the course of 10–20 years after the onset of symptoms, ultimately ending in death. CARASIL is a degenerative disease, and most patients live only 10 years past symptom onset, although some may live for 20–30 more years.

== Epidemiology ==
Of the approximately 50 cases worldwide, the majority were found in Japan, with a few cases in China, Spain, Portugal, and Romania. CARASIL appears to affect males more often than females. A ratio of 7.5 males to 1 female was observed in Japan.

== Research ==
Research consists primarily of case studies reporting observed cases of CARASIL, one study suggests that a possible future treatment option may be inhibition of TGF-β signaling by an angiotensin I receptor agonist, due to the fact that an excess of TGF-β signaling is involved in causing CARASIL. This approach has been used in Marfan syndrome, which also involves excessive TGF-β signaling. This suggestion has not yet been tested.

A study examining the MRI scans of seven CARASIL patients in Japan found a characteristic "arc sign" in advanced cases. This may be used in the future to determine which patients should undergo genetic testing for CARASIL.

The connection with vascular diseases of the heart is unclear.

== See also ==
- CADASIL (Cerebral Autosomal Dominant Arteriopathy With Subcortical Infarcts And Leukoencephalopathy)
- CARASAL (Cathepsin-A Related Arteriopathy with Strokes And Leukoencephalopathy)
