= Galactosialidosis =

Rare disease

- Other names: Neuraminidase deficiency with beta-galactosidase deficiency
- Lysosomes contain digestive enzymes that break down cellular waste.
- Specialty: Endocrinology

Galactosialidosis, also known as neuraminidase deficiency with beta-galactosidase deficiency, is a genetic lysosomal storage disease. It is caused by a mutation in the CTSA gene which leads to a deficiency of enzymes β-galactosidase and neuraminidase. This deficiency inhibits the lysosomes of cells from functioning properly, resulting in the accumulation of toxic matter within the cell. Hallmark symptoms include abnormal spinal structure, vision problems, coarse facial features, hearing impairment, and intellectual disability. Because galactosialidosis involves the lysosomes of all cells, it can affect various areas of the body, including the brain, eyes, bones, and muscles. Depending on the patient's age at the onset of symptoms, the disease consists of three subtypes: early infantile, late infantile, and juvenile/adult. This condition is considered rare, with most cases having been in the juvenile/adult group of patients.

== Signs and symptoms ==
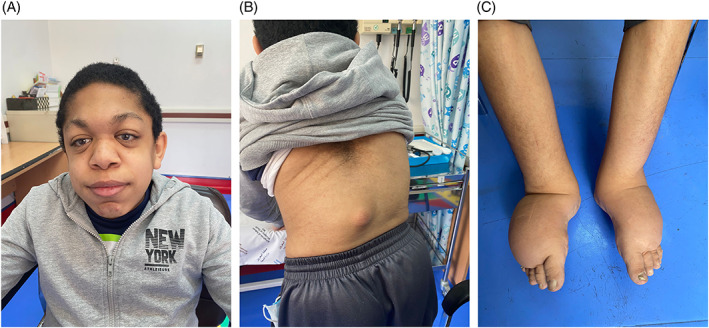
(A) Typical facial features of galactosialidosis (B) Thoracolumbar kyphosis (C) Bilateral lower limb lymphedema

The signs and symptoms of galactosialidosis range from mild to severe, and can vary amongst patients depending on the age of the individual when symptoms begin as well as the specific subtype of disease each person has. Symptoms can also vary amongst individuals within the same subtype, but it is known that the earlier a person shows symptoms, the more severe the disease tends to progress over time.

Individuals who are diagnosed with early infantile galactosialidosis have symptoms that present just before or after birth and tend to be most severe. The most common symptoms include abnormal fluid build-up, hepatosplenomegaly, enlarged heart, abnormal bone development, kidney disease that progressively worsens, coarse facial features, and a cherry red spot on the back of the eye.

Those who are diagnosed with late infantile subtype have symptoms that are similar to early infantile, except that they present around six months of age and tend to be less severe. Additional symptoms in this subtype can include growth problems, hearing or vision problems, and seizures.

Juvenile/adult subtype symptoms include impaired balance or coordination, dark red spots on the skin or angiokeratomas, vision loss, seizures, and muscle jerks or myoclonus. The symptoms of this subtype tend to be less severe than the first two subtypes, and typically start in adolescence, with the average age being 16 years of age.

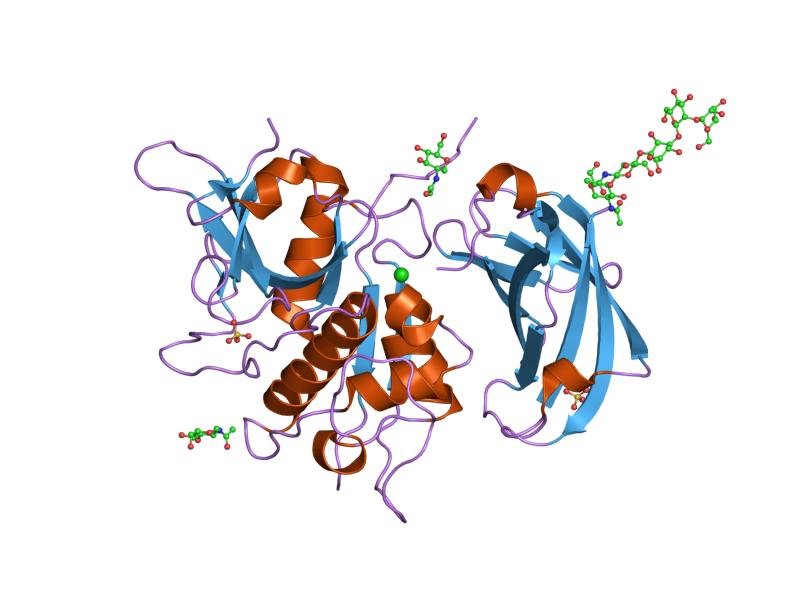
Molecular structure of the enzyme cathepsin A

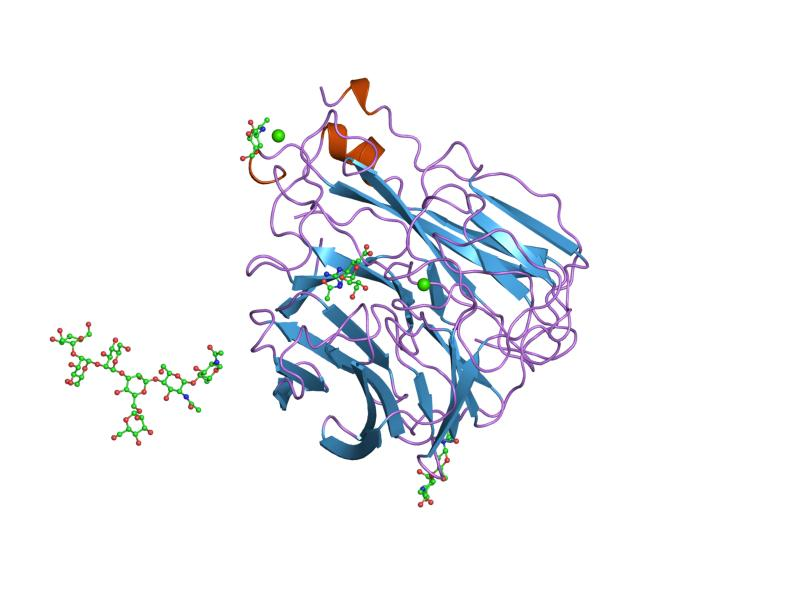
Molecular structure of the enzyme neuraminidase-1 (NEU1)

== Causes ==
=== Molecular biology ===
Galactosialidosis is caused by a mutation in the CTSA gene. This gene encodes the enzyme cathepsin A, which forms a protein complex with neuraminidase-1 and beta-galactosidase to break down fats, sugars, and proteins ingested by lysosomes. Cathepsin A is required in this process because within the complex, it prevents neuraminidase-1 and beta-galactosidase from breaking down prematurely, so that they may perform their functions properly. When the CTSA gene is mutated, the protein structure of cathepsin A is defective, making it incapable of binding to other proteins or forming complexes. This leads to a deficiency of beta-galactosidase (GLB1) and neuraminidase-1 (NEU1). As a result, the lysosome is unable to break down toxic substances and waste builds up within the cell.

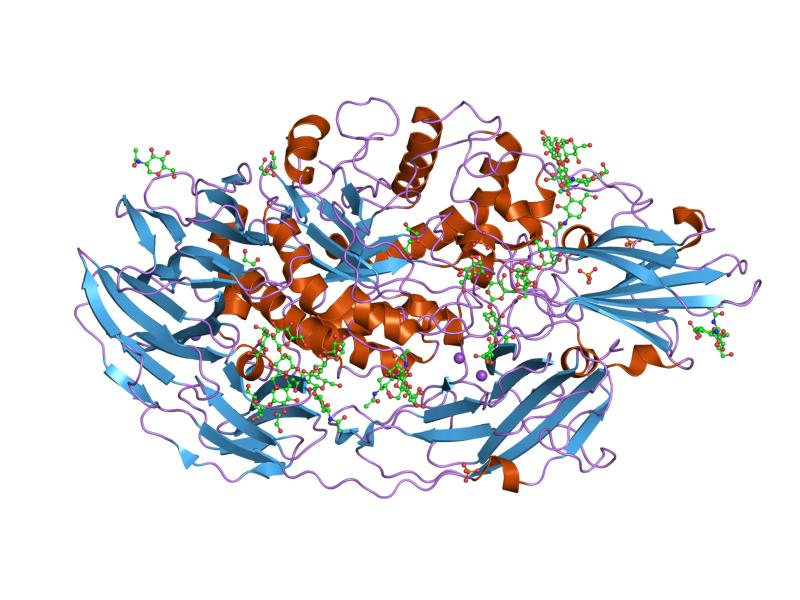
Molecular structure of the enzyme beta-galatosidase

=== Genetic inheritance ===
All individuals diagnosed with galactosialidosis have inherited the condition in an autosomal recessive manner, regardless of age or subtype. All genes consist of two copies, one received from each parent. When a disease is recessive, it means that two mutated copies of a gene are required for someone to inherit the trait or disorder. When each parent carries one mutated copy of the same gene, there is a 25% possibility that their offspring will inherit both copies of the gene and develop the disease. In galactosialidosis, both parents of the patient would have carried a mutated copy of the CTSA gene. The affected child inherits both copies, leading to the development of the disease.

There are no known environmental or medical associations related to the cause of galactosialidosis.

Galactosialidosis is inherited in an autosomal recessive manner, and requires both parents to be carriers of the mutated gene.

== Pathophysiology ==
Galactosialidosis occurs when a patient inherits two copies of a mutated CTSA gene. Encoding of the mutated gene results in a defective form of the protein cathepsin A. When the structure of cathepsin A is disrupted due to mutation, it becomes non-functional and cannot form a digestive complex with neuraminidase-1 and beta-galactosidase. As a result, toxic materials accumulate within the cells of the body due to the lysosomes' inability to perform their functions.

== Diagnosis ==
When the characteristic symptoms of galactosialidosis are suspected, patients can undergo specific testing to confirm their diagnosis. One common method includes enzyme assays which measure the activity of neuraminidase-1 and beta-galactosidase. Decreased levels in enzymatic activity indicate a deficiency in cathepsin A. A complete urinalysis can be performed to detect the presence of oligosaccharides, which would pass through the urine as excess amounts accumulate within cells due to lysosomal dysfunction.

A diagnosis can more specifically be confirmed through molecular genetic analysis, which is used to identify a mutation in the CTSA gene. Once a mutation is detected, the results are combined with a clinical exam and patient symptoms to fully diagnose galactosialidosis. The age of the patient at the onset of symptoms is used to determine the specific disease subtype of the patient. Early infantile patients are diagnosed between birth and 3 months of age, late infantile patients are diagnosed between 3–12 months of age, and juvenile/adult patients are normally diagnosed in adolescence when symptoms begin.

A prenatal diagnosis was made by Kleijer et al. in 1979 by measuring beta-galactosidase and neuraminidase activities in cultured amniotic fluid cells.

== Prevention ==
Because the disease is genetically inherited, the only prevention available for this condition is through genetic carrier screening that can detect the presence of a recessive, mutated CTSA gene in parents before they decide to have children. If both parents are found to be carriers of the mutated gene, there will be a 25% possibility of the child inheriting the disease; this cannot be prevented.

== Treatment ==
Currently, there is no cure for galactosialidosis. However, there are treatments available that help to manage symptoms and provide supportive care. For example, a treatment plan may include medications to control seizures or muscle jerks. It is also common for patients to establish routine care with a medical geneticist, neurologist, and ophthalmologist depending on the symptoms they are experiencing and the frequency at which they occur.

== Prognosis ==
The prognosis of individuals diagnosed with galactosialidosis varies between patients, depending on age and severity of symptoms. Therefore, there is no established average age at which patients die or have an increased risk of death. There is no chance of full recovery in any form of the disease.

=== Early infantile ===
Patients diagnosed with early infantile subtype have more severe, threatening symptoms and a decreased chance of survival because this subtype develops more rapidly; however, it is noted that most patients do live into late infancy.

=== Late infantile ===
Because patients with the late infantile subtype develop symptoms within the first year of life, their condition is not as severe as the early infantile subtype and the chance of survival is higher; however, the quality of life is still greatly affected because the patient is so young when symptoms occur. The patient will still require a detailed care plan to manage symptoms.

=== Juvenile/adult ===
Patients diagnosed with the juvenile/adult subtype have less severe symptoms but will have to manage progressive mental disability, spinal deformities, and seizures amongst other common symptoms. However, this subtype is typically associated with a normal life expectancy.

== Epidemiology ==
Galactosialidosis is considered a very rare disease, though its prevalence is not exactly known. Less than 150 cases have been reported in the literature; of that population, about 60% of cases were of the juvenile/adult subtype with symptoms beginning at or after 16 years of age. It is also documented that most cases occur in people of Japanese descent.

== Research ==
There is a need for research that leads to a better understanding of galactosialidosis, advances in diagnoses, and more effective treatment. More recent research has been done to define the demographics and clinical characteristics of the patient population with galactosialidosis, with the ultimate goal of using this information toward a gene transfer treatment study.

There are currently at least two ongoing clinical trials for galactosialidosis. One study involves research of the glycoproteinoses that constitute some of the rarest lysosomal diseases, including galactosialidosis, aspartylglucosaminuria, fucosidosis, Schindler disease, and sialidosis, amongst other diseases. It is a longitudinal study of 100 patients who are diagnosed with any one of nine glycoproteinoses. The purpose of the study is to better define how common the diseases are, identify clinical features that could contribute to early diagnoses, detail the progression of the diseases, assess the supportive therapies currently being used, and identify possible treatments.
