= Marie-Germaine Bousser =

French neuroscientist (born 1943)

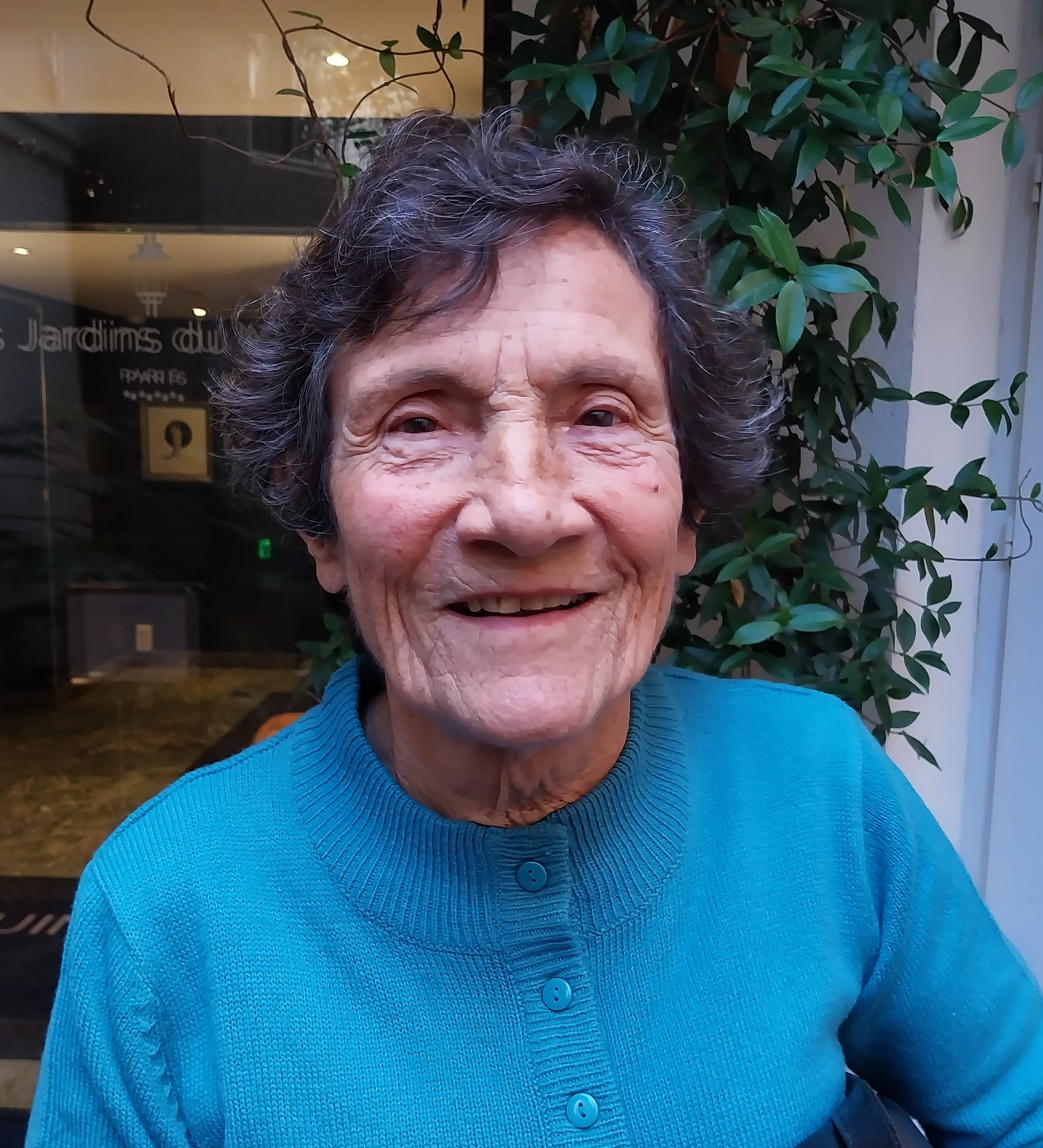
- Marie-Germaine Bousser in 2024.
- Born: 11 August 1943 (age 83)
- Education: Paris-Sorbonne University
- Occupation: neuroscientist
- Known for: Discovery of CADASIL

Marie-Germaine Bousser (born 11 August 1943) is a French neuroscientist. She won the Brain Prize in 2019 for her work on CADASIL.

== Biography ==
Bousser graduated from Paris-Sorbonne University in neuro-psychiatry in 1972 with her thesis devoted to the prevention of cortical artery thrombosis in rabbits by aspirin and PGE1.

She trained at the Pitié-Salpêtrière Hospital. Subsequently, she worked at the National Hospital for Neurology and Neurosurgery, before returning to Paris. She became a Professor of Neurology at Pitié-Salpêtrière Hospital in 1981. She became head of neurology at the Saint-Antoine Hospital in Paris in 1989, where she stayed until 1997. She returned to Pitié-Salpêtrière Hospital in 1997, becoming the head of neurology there. She later became Emeritus Professor at the Paris-Diderot University.

== Research ==
Bousser is most well known for her role in the discovery of CADASIL, a hereditary form of stroke. She researched the, then unnamed, condition for the first time in 1976, when a patient entered her clinic with signs of Binswanger's disease after suffering a stroke. She found that the condition was hereditary after children of the initial patient presented similar symptoms. In 1993 she showed, together with Elisabeth Tournier-Lasserve, that the condition was caused by a mutation on chromosome 19. They subsequently named the condition CADASIL.

== Awards ==
Bousser is Commander of the Legion of Honor (2013) and Grand Officer of the Order of Merit (2018)

- 2008 Johann Jakob Wepfer Prize
- 2012 World Stroke Organisation President's Award
- 2019 Brain Prize
