= Elisabeth Tournier-Lasserve =

French neurologist, medical geneticist and university professor

Élisabeth Tournier-Lasserve
- Born: 7 October 1954; France
- Occupation(s): Neurologist, university professor and researcher
- Known for: Research into the genetic disease CADASIL
- Awards: (1) Prix Lefoulon Delalande. Institut de France, Paris; (2) The Brain Prize

Élisabeth Tournier-Lasserve (born 1954) is a French neurologist, medical geneticist, university professor and hospital practitioner in genetics. Together with three colleagues, she was the co-recipient of the Brain Prize in 2019, the world's largest brain research prize.

== Training ==
Élisabeth Tournier-Lasserve was born on 7 October 1954. She studied medicine, including neurology, at the Pitié-Salpêtrière Hospital, a teaching hospital of the Sorbonne University in the 13th arrondissement of Paris. After obtaining a doctorate in medicine in 1984, she worked at the Pitié-Salpêtrière Hospital for two years before doing post-doctoral work at the National Institutes of Health at Bethesda, Maryland, USA.

== Career ==
In 1989, Tournier-Lasserve joined the Institut national de la santé et de la recherche médicale (Inserm), the French National Institute of Health and Medical Research, as a researcher. She then became research director at the Necker-Enfants Malades Hospital and, in 1999, formed the Inserm "Genetics of vascular diseases" unit at the Molecular Genetics Laboratory at Lariboisière Hospital, which is a teaching hospital of the Faculty of Medicine of Paris Diderot University. She is now head of the Molecular Genetics Laboratory, which provides a diagnostic service for hereditary neurovascular diseases for all French hospitals.

With the geneticist Marie-Germaine Bousser, she discovered a genetic disease, designated by the acronym CADASIL (cerebral autosomal dominant arteriopathy with subcortical infarcts and leukoencephalopathy), which is an adult-onset disorder characterized by recurrent ischemic strokes, dementia, and premature death. Bousser had first researched the condition in 1976, when a patient with signs of Binswanger's disease suffered a stroke. She found that the condition was hereditary and in 1993 she showed, together with Tournier-Lasserve, that the condition was caused by a mutation on chromosome 19. The discovery was published in 1993 in the scientific journal Nature Genetics. Tournier-Lasserve's main research interest over the past 25 years has been hereditary neurovascular disorders. After the identification of the gene involved in CADASIL, her team identified several other genes involved in cerebral small-vessel diseases and cerebral cavernous malformations (CCM) and developed diagnostic tools for these conditions to improve clinical care and genetic counselling for patients and families. Recently, she has been involved in researching moyamoya disease.

== Honours and awards ==
The major awards and honours won by Tournier-Lasserve and her team are:

- 2001 American Academy of Neurology, Frontiers in Clinical Neurosciences Prize
- 2004 Inserm Clinical Research Prize
- 2013, F.E. Bennett Memorial Lectureship.
- 2015 Yvette Rouannet Prize, Fondation pour la Recherche Médicale.
- 2016 Grand Prix scientifique de la Fondation Lefoulon-Delalande, Paris (shared with Elisabetta Dejana).
- 2019 The Brain Prize (shared with Anne Joutel, Hugues Chabriat and Marie-Germaine Bousser.
- 2021 The Fulton Award, World Congress of Neurology 2021
