= Subcortical dementia =

- Specialty: Neurology

Subcortical dementias includes those diseases which predominantly affects the basal ganglia along with features of cognitive decline.

Diseases such as progressive supranuclear palsy, Huntington's chorea and Parkinson's disease are different in many features from the other cortical dementias like Alzheimer's disease. Yet these patients present clinically with mild forgetfulness and slowed thought process along with abnormal movements and problems with motility.

== Clinical features ==
Clinically subcortical dementia usually is seen with features like slowness of mental processing, forgetfulness, impaired cognition, lack of initiative-apathy, depressive symptoms (such as anhedonia, negative thoughts, loss of self-esteem and dysphoria), loss of social skills along with extrapyramidal features like tremors and abnormal movements.

In most of the patients with Huntington's diseases the first clinical feature to appear is the change in personality. The dementia is more severe in patients with early onset of Huntington's disease.

Parkinson's disease is characterised by features of dementia in older age. The adult type "leukodystrophy" also causes subcortical dementia with prominent frontal lobe features.

As a general rule the earliest symptoms in "cortical" dementia include difficulty with high-level behaviors such as memory, language, problem-solving and reasoning, mathematics and abstract thoughts – functions associated with the cerebral cortex. Such patients have prominent apraxia and agnosia.

However, in "subcortical" dementia these high-level behaviours are less affected.

== Pathophysiology ==
In most common types of dementias there is widespread degeneration in the cerebral cortex – such as the plaques and neuro fibrillary tangles which are the hallmark of Alzheimer's disease. In subcortical dementia, there is targeted damage to regions lying under the cortex.

The pathological process that result in subcortical dementia shows neuronal changes that involve primarily the thalamus, basal ganglia, and rostral brain-stem nuclei and mostly, some projections in the white matter from these regions to the cortex, with relative sparing of the cerebral cortex.

It affects arousal, attention, mood, motivation, language, memory, abstraction, social skills (especially empathy), extrapyramidal functions, and visuospatial skills. Additionally, damage to the basal forebrain can cause amnesia and psychotic disorders.

== Controversy ==
One of the problems with the concept of subcortical dementia is the fact that name implies that it is due to lesions confined to subcortical structures. Anatomically none of the neurodegenerative dementias are strictly cortical or subcortical. In fact, there is invariably an overlap of both cortical and subcortical neuronal changes in both types.

== History ==
Charcot described dementia as a feature in Parkinson's disease. McHugh introduced the concept of subcortical dementia.

Mayeux and Stern and their colleagues and Tierney and coworkers have been critical of the concept of subcortical dementia.

== Examples ==
- Progressive supranuclear palsy (chronic acetogenin poisoning)
- Atypical Parkinsonism
- Binswanger disease (and other forms of vascular dementia)
- Corticobasal degeneration
- Huntington disease
- Multiple system atrophy
- HIV-associated neurocognitive disorder (HAND)
- HIV-associated dementia
