= Glycoside hydrolase family 33 =

Sialidase, N-terminal domain
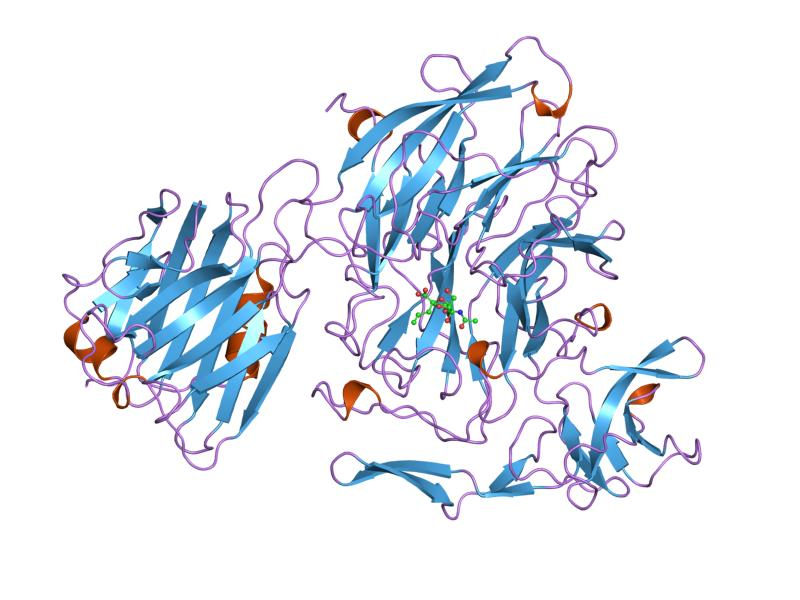

Identifiers
- Symbol: Sialidase
- Pfam: PF02973
- InterPro: IPR004124
- SCOP2: 1sli / SCOPe / SUPFAM
- CAZy: GH33
Available protein structures:
- PDB: IPR004124 PF02973 (ECOD; PDBsum)
- AlphaFold: IPR004124; PF02973

In molecular biology, glycoside hydrolase family 33 is a family of glycoside hydrolases.

Glycoside hydrolases EC 3.2.1. are a widespread group of enzymes that hydrolyse the glycosidic bond between two or more carbohydrates, or between a carbohydrate and a non-carbohydrate moiety. A classification system for glycoside hydrolases, based on sequence similarity, has led to the definition of >100 different families. This classification is available on the CAZy web site, and also discussed at CAZypedia, an online encyclopedia of carbohydrate active enzymes.

This family contains sialidases (CAZY GH_33), which hydrolyse alpha-(2->3)-, alpha-(2->6)-, alpha-(2->8)-glycosidic linkages of terminal sialic residues in oligosaccharides, glycoproteins, glycolipids, colominic acid and synthetic substrates. Sialidases may act as pathogenic factors in microbial infections. The 1.8 A structure of trans-sialidase from leech (Macrobdella decora, Q27701) in complex with 2-deoxy-2, 3-didehydro-NeuAc was solved. The refined model comprising residues 81-769 has a catalytic beta-propeller domain, a N-terminal lectin-like domain and an irregular beta-stranded domain inserted into the catalytic domain.
