= Serine protease HTRA1 =

Protein-coding gene in the species Homo sapiens

HTRA1
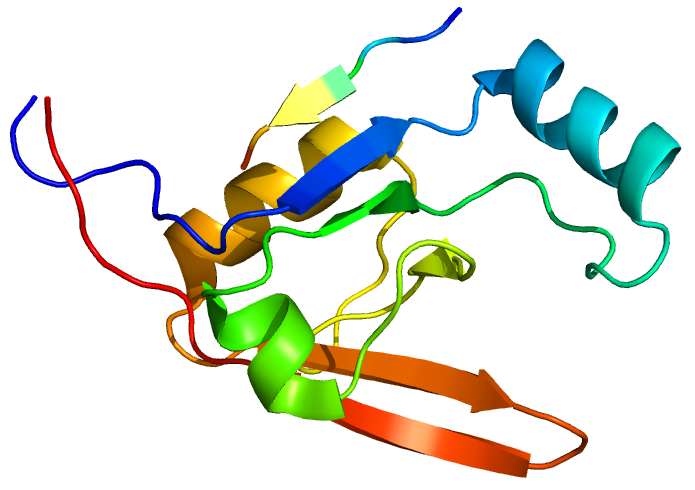

Identifiers
- Aliases: HTRA1, ARMD7, CARASIL, HtrA, L56, ORF480, PRSS11, CADASIL2, HtrA serine peptidase 1
- External IDs: OMIM: 602194; MGI: 1929076; GeneCards: HTRA1
Available structures
PDB	Ortholog search: PDBe RCSB
PDB	List of PDB id codes 2JOA, 2YTW, 3NUM, 3NWU, 3NZI, 3TJN, 3TJO, 3TJQ

Gene location (Human)
Chr.	Chromosome 10 (human)
Band	10q26.13	Start	122,458,551 bp
Band	10q26.13	End	122,514,907 bp

Gene location (Mouse)
Chr.	Chromosome 7 (mouse)
Band	7|7 F3	Start	130,537,841 bp
Band	7|7 F3	End	130,587,390 bp
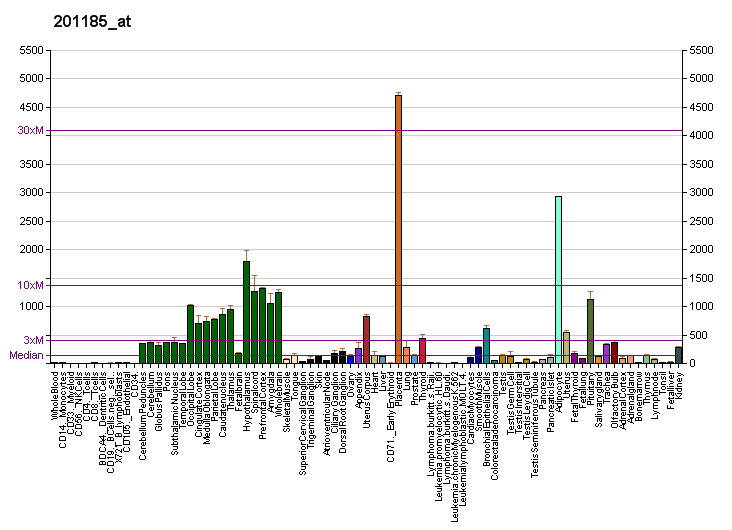
RNA expression pattern
Bgee	Human / Mouse (ortholog); Top expressed in: tendon of biceps brachii; glomerulus; metanephric glomerulus; Descending thoracic aorta; stromal cell of endometrium; ascending aorta; synovial membrane; middle frontal gyrus; synovial joint; putamen / Top expressed in: decidua; epithelium of lens; facial motor nucleus; gastrula; cumulus cell; calvaria; umbilical cord; ascending aorta; motor neuron; tunica media of zone of aorta; More reference expression data
BioGPS	More reference expression data
Gene ontology
Molecular function	insulin-like growth factor binding; growth factor binding; peptidase activity; serine-type peptidase activity; hydrolase activity; serine-type endopeptidase activity; protein binding; identical protein binding
Cellular component	cytoplasm; cytosol; membrane; extracellular matrix; plasma membrane; extracellular exosome; extracellular region; extracellular space; collagen-containing extracellular matrix
Biological process	negative regulation of defense response to virus; chorionic trophoblast cell differentiation; positive regulation of epithelial cell proliferation; placenta development; dentinogenesis; negative regulation of transforming growth factor beta receptor signaling pathway; proteolysis; negative regulation of BMP signaling pathway; regulation of cell growth; extracellular matrix disassembly
Sources:Amigo / QuickGO
Orthologs
Databases	NCBI: entry; OMA: entry
Species	Human	Mouse
Entrez	5654	56213
Ensembl	ENSG00000166033	ENSMUSG00000006205
UniProt	Q92743	Q9R118
RefSeq (mRNA)	NM_002775	NM_019564
RefSeq (protein)	NP_002766	NP_062510
Location (UCSC)	Chr 10: 122.46 – 122.51 Mb	Chr 7: 130.54 – 130.59 Mb
PubMed search
- Wikidata
View/Edit Human	View/Edit Mouse

Serine protease HTRA1 is an enzyme that in humans is encoded by the HTRA1 gene.

== Structure ==
The HTRA1 protein is composed of four distinct protein domains. They are from amino-terminus to carboxyl-terminus an Insulin-like growth factor binding domain, a kazal domain, a trypsin-like peptidase domain and a PDZ domain.

This gene encodes a member of the trypsin family of serine proteases.

== Function ==
This protein is a secreted enzyme that is proposed to regulate the availability of insulin-like growth factors (IGFs) by cleaving IGF-binding proteins. It has also been suggested to be a regulator of cell growth.

== Clinical significance ==
Mutations of this gene are responsible for the development of CARASIL, a genetic form of cerebral vasculopathy.
