= Neuraminidase =

Glycoside hydrolase enzymes that cleave the glycosidic linkages of neuraminic acids

exo-α-sialidase

Identifiers
- EC no.: 3.2.1.18
- CAS no.: 9001-67-6

Databases
- BRENDA: enzyme data
- ExPASy: NiceZyme view
- KEGG: enzyme entry
- MetaCyc: metabolic pathway
- Rhea: reactions
- PDB structures: RCSB PDB PDBe PDBsum
- Gene Ontology: AmiGO / QuickGO
Search
- PMC: articles
- PubMed: articles
- NCBI: proteins

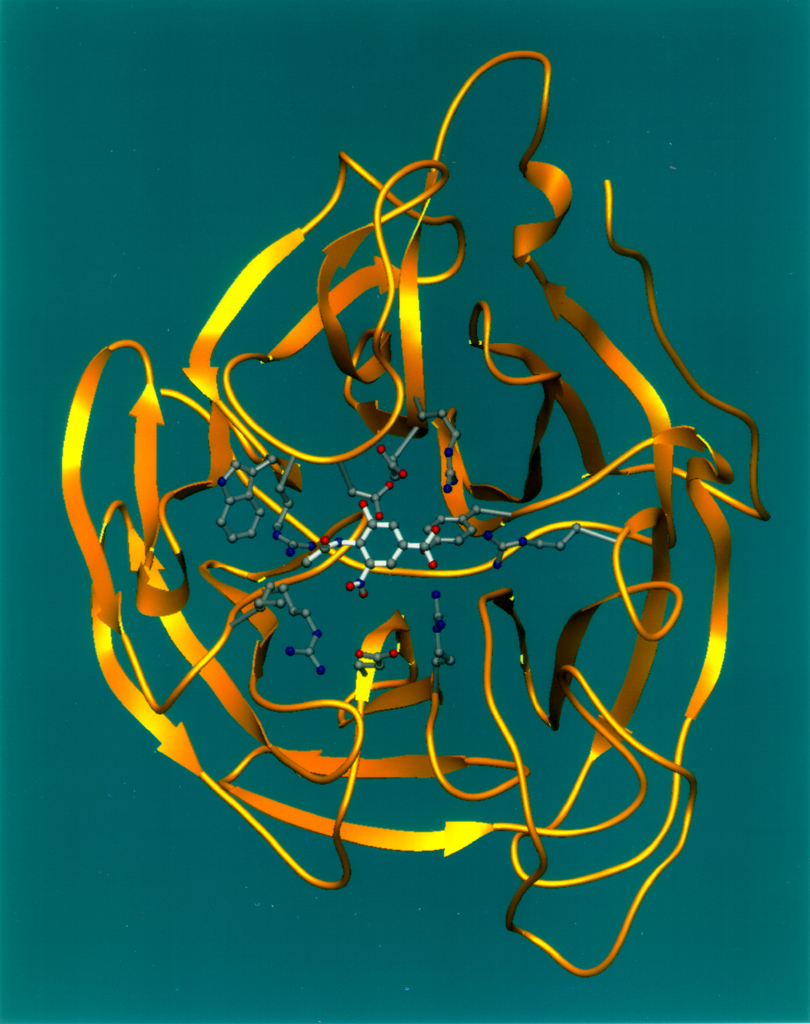
Neuraminidase (GH34) ribbon diagram. An analog of its neuraminic acid substrate, used as an inhibitor drug, is the small white and red molecule in the center.

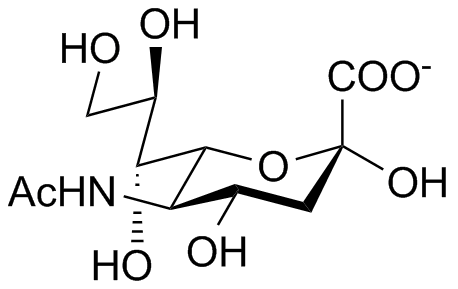
N-Acetylneuraminic acid

Exo-α-sialidase (EC 3.2.1.18, sialidase, neuraminidase; systematic name acetylneuraminyl hydrolase) is a glycoside hydrolase that cleaves the glycosidic linkages of neuraminic acids:

Hydrolysis of α-(2→3)-, α-(2→6)-, α-(2→8)- glycosidic linkages of terminal sialic acid residues in oligosaccharides, glycoproteins, glycolipids, colominic acid and synthetic substrates

Neuraminidase enzymes are a large family, found in a range of organisms. The best-known neuraminidase is the viral neuraminidase, a drug target for the prevention of the spread of influenza infection. Viral neuraminidase was the first neuraminidase to be identified. It was discovered in 1957 by Alfred Gottschalk at the Walter and Eliza Hall Institute in Melbourne. The viral neuraminidases are frequently used as antigenic determinants found on the surface of the influenza virus. Some variants of the influenza neuraminidase confer more virulence to the virus than others. Other homologues are found in mammalian cells, which have a range of functions. At least four mammalian sialidase homologues have been described in the human genome (see NEU1, NEU2, NEU3, NEU4). Sialidases may act as pathogenic factors in microbial infections.

== Reaction ==
There are two major classes of neuraminidase that cleave exo or endo poly-sialic acids:

- Exo hydrolysis of α-(2→3)-, α-(2→6)-, α-(2→8)-glycosidic linkages of terminal sialic acid residues
- Endo hydrolysis of (2→8)-α-sialosyl linkages in oligo- or poly(sialic) acids (see EC 3.2.1.129 endo-α-sialidase.)

== Function ==
Sialidases, also called neuraminidases, catalyze the hydrolysis of terminal sialic acid residues from the newly formed virions and from the host cell receptors. Sialidase activities include assistance in the mobility of virus particles through the respiratory tract mucus and in the elution of virion progeny from the infected cell.

== Subtypes ==
Swiss-Prot lists 137 types of neuraminidase from various species as of October 18, 2006. Nine subtypes of influenza neuraminidase are known; many occur only in various species of duck and chicken. Subtypes N1 and N2 have been positively linked to epidemics in humans, and strains with N3 or N7 subtypes have been identified in a number of isolated deaths.

CAZy defines a total of 85 glycosyl hydrolase families, of which families GH34 (viral), GH33 (cellular organisms), GH58 (viral and bacterial), GH83 (viral) are major families that contain this enzyme. GH58 is the only endo-acting family.

The following is a list of major classes of neuraminidase enzymes:

- Viral neuraminidase
- Bacterial neuraminidase
- Mammalian neuraminidases:

sialidase 1 (lysosomal sialidase)

Identifiers
- Symbol: NEU1
- NCBI gene: 4758
- HGNC: 7758
- OMIM: 608272
- RefSeq: NM_000434
- UniProt: Q99519

Other data
- Locus: Chr. 6 p21
Search for
- Structures: Swiss-model
- Domains: InterPro

sialidase 2 (cytosolic sialidase)

Identifiers
- Symbol: NEU2
- NCBI gene: 4759
- HGNC: 7759
- OMIM: 605528
- RefSeq: NM_005383
- UniProt: Q9Y3R4

Other data
- Locus: Chr. 2 q37
Search for
- Structures: Swiss-model
- Domains: InterPro

sialidase 3 (membrane sialidase)

Identifiers
- Symbol: NEU3
- NCBI gene: 10825
- HGNC: 7760
- OMIM: 604617
- RefSeq: NM_006656
- UniProt: Q9UQ49

Other data
- Locus: Chr. 11 q13.5
Search for
- Structures: Swiss-model
- Domains: InterPro

sialidase 4

Identifiers
- Symbol: NEU4
- NCBI gene: 129807
- HGNC: 21328
- OMIM: 608527
- RefSeq: NM_080741
- UniProt: Q8WWR8

Other data
- Locus: Chr. 2 q37.3
Search for
- Structures: Swiss-model
- Domains: InterPro

== Structure ==
Influenza neuraminidase is a mushroom-shaped projection on the surface of the influenza virus. It has a head consisting of four co-planar and roughly spherical subunits, and a hydrophobic region that is embedded within the interior of the virus' membrane. It comprises a single polypeptide chain that is oriented in the opposite direction to the hemagglutinin antigen. The composition of the polypeptide is a single chain of six conserved polar amino acids, followed by hydrophilic, variable amino acids. β-Sheets predominate as the secondary level of protein conformation.

The structure of trans-sialidase includes a catalytic β-propeller domain, a N-terminal lectin-like domain and an irregular beta-stranded domain inserted into the catalytic domain.

Recent emergence of oseltamivir and zanamivir resistant human influenza A(H1N1) H274Y has emphasized the need for suitable expression systems to obtain large quantities of highly pure and stable, recombinant neuraminidase through two separate artificial tetramerization domains that facilitate the formation of catalytically active neuraminidase homotetramers from yeast and Staphylothermus marinus, which allow for secretion of FLAG-tagged proteins and further purification.

== Mechanism ==
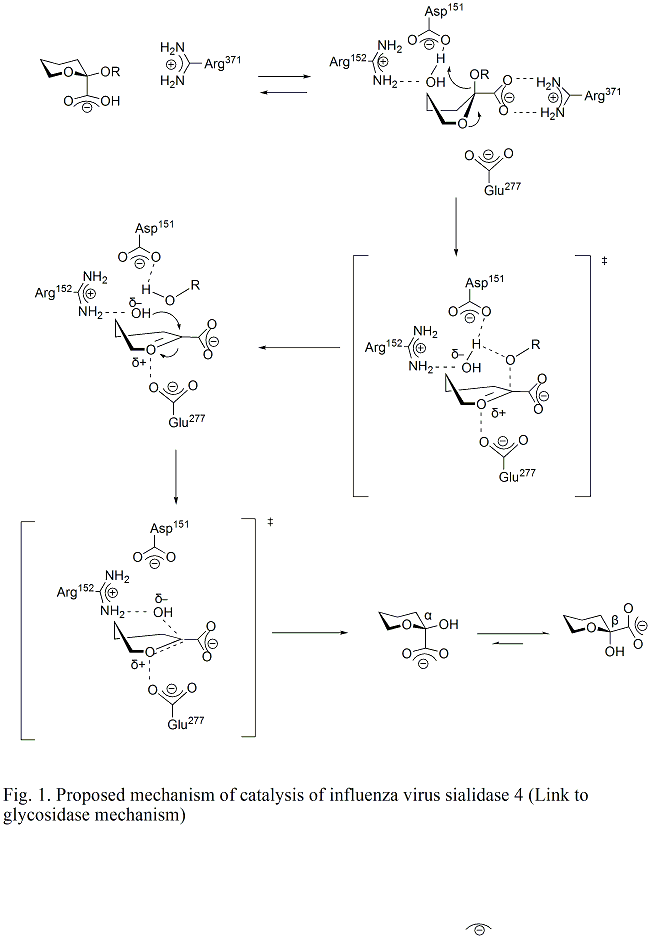
Proposed mechanism of catalysis of influenza virus sialidase 4 (Link to glycosidase mechanism)

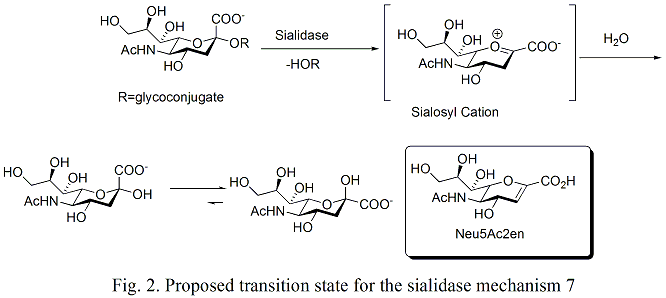
Proposed transition state for the sialidase mechanism 7

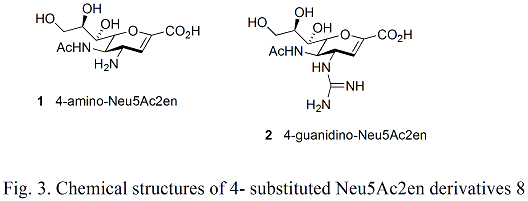
Chemical structures of 4- substituted Neu5Ac2en derivatives 8

The enzymatic mechanism of influenza virus sialidase has been studied by Taylor et al., shown in Figure 1. The enzyme catalysis process has four steps. The first step involves the distortion of the α-sialoside from a ^{2}C_{5} chair conformation (the lowest-energy form in solution) to a pseudoboat conformation when the sialoside binds to the sialidase. The second step leads to an oxocarbocation intermediate, the sialosyl cation. The third step is the formation of Neu5Ac initially as the α-anomer, and then mutarotation and release as the more thermodynamically stable β-Neu5Ac.

== Inhibitors ==
Neuraminidase inhibitors are useful for combating influenza infection: zanamivir, administered by inhalation; oseltamivir, administered orally; peramivir administered parenterally, that is through intravenous or intramuscular injection; and laninamivir which is in phase III clinical trials.

There are two major proteins on the surface of influenza virus particles. One is the lectin haemagglutinin protein with three relatively shallow sialic acid-binding sites and the other is enzyme sialidase with the active site in a pocket. Because of the relative deep active site in which low-molecular-weight inhibitors can make multiple favorable interactions and approachable methods of designing transition-state analogues in the hydrolysis of sialosides, the sialidase becomes more attractive anti-influenza drug target than the haemagglutinin. After the X-ray crystal structures of several influenza virus sialidases were available, the structure-based inhibitor design was applied to discover potent inhibitors of this enzyme.

The unsaturated sialic acid (N-acetylneuraminic acid [Neu5ac]) derivative 2-deoxy-2, 3-didehydro-D-N-acetylneuraminic acid (Neu5Ac2en), a sialosyl cation transition-state (Figure 2) analogue, is believed the most potent inhibitor core template. Structurally modified Neu5Ac2en derivatives may give more effective inhibitors.

Many Neu5Ac2en-based compounds have been synthesized and tested for their influenza virus sialidase inhibitory potential. For example: The 4-substituted Neu5Ac2en derivatives (Figure 3), 4-amino-Neu5Ac2en (Compound 1), which showed two orders of magnitude better inhibition of influenza virus sialidase than Neu5Ac2en5 and 4-guanidino-Neu5Ac2en (Compound 2), known as Zanamivir, which is now marketed for treatment of influenza virus as a drug, have been designed by von Itzstein and coworkers. A series of amide-linked C9 modified Neu5Ac2en have been reported by Megesh and colleagues as NEU1 inhibitors.

== See also ==
- Glycoside hydrolase family 33
- Neuraminidase inhibitors
- Hemagglutinin (influenza)
