= NOTCH3 =

Protein-coding gene in humans

Identifiers
- Aliases: NOTCH3, CADASIL, CASIL, IMF2, LMNS, CADASIL1, notch 3, notch receptor 3
- External IDs: OMIM: 600276; MGI: 99460; GeneCards: NOTCH3
Available structures
PDB	Ortholog search: PDBe RCSB
PDB	List of PDB id codes 4ZLP, 5CZX, 5CZV

Gene location (Human)
Chr.	Chromosome 19 (human)
Band	19p13.12	Start	15,159,038 bp
Band	19p13.12	End	15,200,995 bp

Gene location (Mouse)
Chr.	Chromosome 17 (mouse)
Band	17 B1|17 17.37 cM	Start	32,339,794 bp
Band	17 B1|17 17.37 cM	End	32,385,826 bp
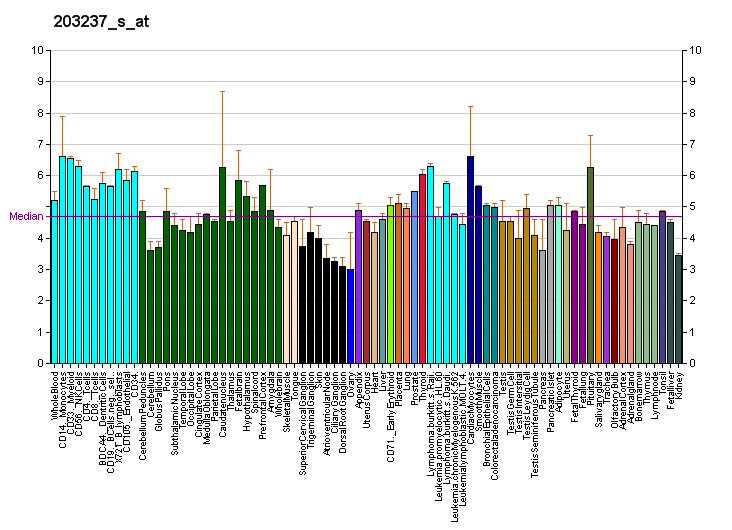

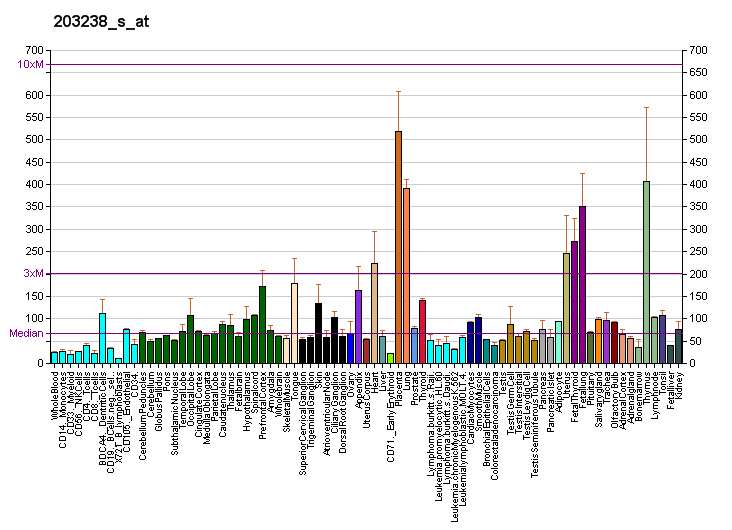
RNA expression pattern
Bgee	Human / Mouse (ortholog); Top expressed in: popliteal artery; tibial arteries; right coronary artery; ventricular zone; Descending thoracic aorta; ascending aorta; left coronary artery; saphenous vein; skin of leg; stromal cell of endometrium / Top expressed in: external carotid artery; corneal stroma; internal carotid artery; ankle joint; molar; vas deferens; Gonadal ridge; left lung lobe; lactiferous gland; carotid body; More reference expression data
BioGPS	More reference expression data
Gene ontology
Molecular function	calcium ion binding; protein binding; enzyme binding; cadherin binding; identical protein binding; signaling receptor activity
Cellular component	integral component of membrane; endoplasmic reticulum membrane; membrane; Golgi membrane; receptor complex; plasma membrane; nucleoplasm; extracellular region; actin cytoskeleton; nucleus; cytosol; cell surface
Biological process	Notch signaling pathway; cell differentiation; regulation of transcription, DNA-templated; negative regulation of neuron differentiation; negative regulation of cell differentiation; glomerular capillary formation; negative regulation of transcription by RNA polymerase II; transcription, DNA-templated; multicellular organism development; artery morphogenesis; forebrain development; neuron fate commitment; transcription initiation from RNA polymerase II promoter; positive regulation of transcription by RNA polymerase II; positive regulation of smooth muscle cell proliferation; regulation of developmental process; positive regulation of transcription of Notch receptor target; Notch receptor processing, ligand-dependent; negative regulation of Notch signaling pathway
Sources:Amigo / QuickGO
Orthologs
Databases	NCBI: entry; OMA: entry
Species	Human	Mouse
Entrez	4854	18131
Ensembl	ENSG00000074181	ENSMUSG00000038146
UniProt	Q9UM47	Q61982
RefSeq (mRNA)	NM_000435	NM_008716
RefSeq (protein)	NP_000426	NP_032742
Location (UCSC)	Chr 19: 15.16 – 15.2 Mb	Chr 17: 32.34 – 32.39 Mb
PubMed search
- Wikidata
View/Edit Human	View/Edit Mouse

Neurogenic locus notch homolog protein 3 (Notch 3) is a protein that in humans is encoded by the NOTCH3 gene.

== Function ==
This gene encodes the third discovered human homologue of the Drosophila melanogaster type I membrane protein notch. In Drosophila, notch interaction with its cell-bound ligands (delta, serrate) establishes an intercellular signalling pathway that plays a key role in neural development. Homologues of the notch-ligands have also been identified in human, but precise interactions between these ligands and the human notch homologues remains to be determined.

== Pathology ==
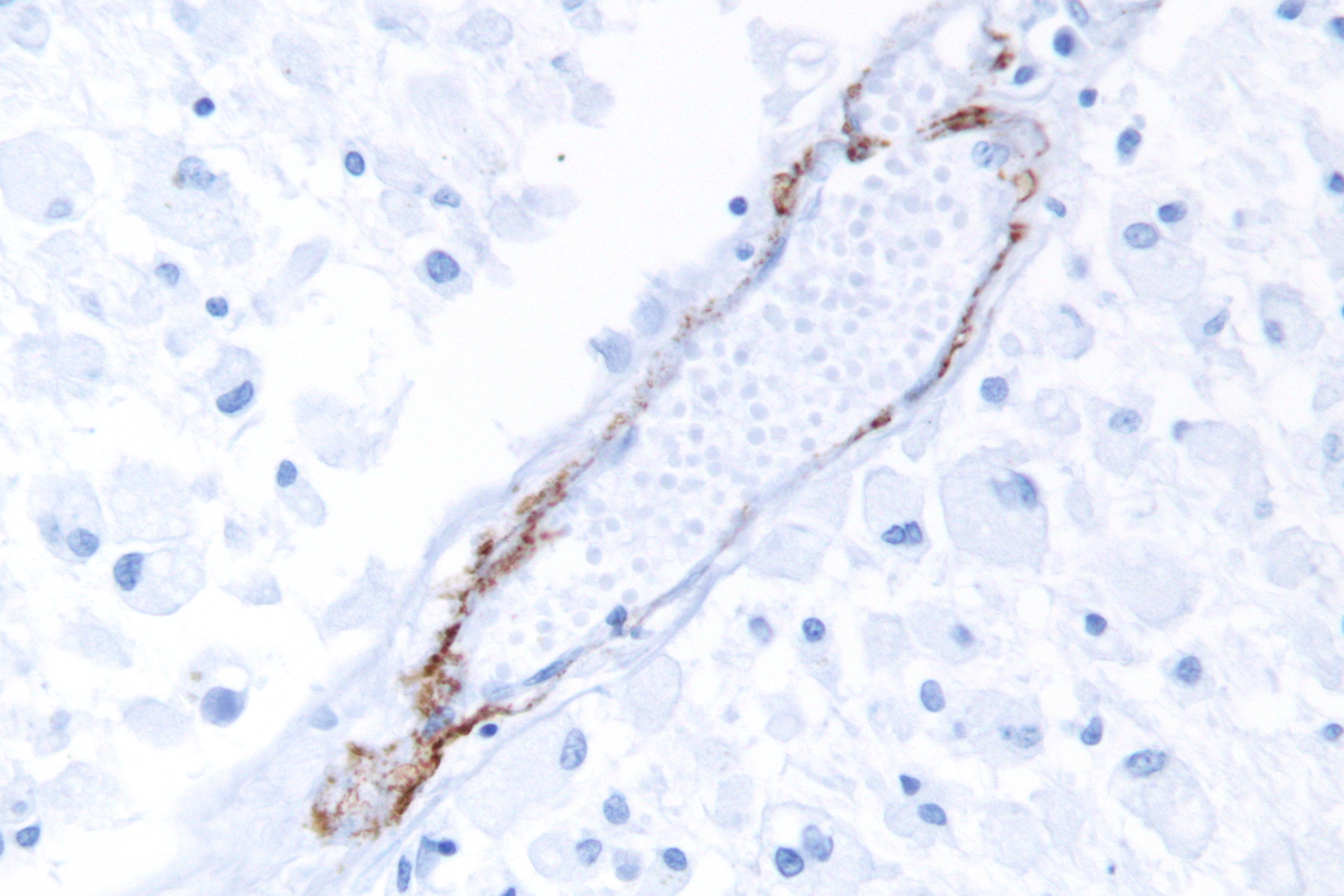
Micrograph showing CADASIL with a Notch 3 immunostain

Mutations in NOTCH3 have been identified as the underlying cause of cerebral autosomal dominant arteriopathy with subcortical infarcts and leukoencephalopathy (CADASIL). Mutations in NOTCH3 have also been identified in families with Alzheimer's disease. Adult Notch3 knock-out mice show incomplete neuronal maturation in the spinal cord dorsal horn, resulting in permanently increased nociceptive sensitivity. Mutations in NOTCH3 are associated to lateral meningocele syndrome.

== Pharmaceutical target ==
Notch3 is being investigated as a target for anti-cancer drugs, as it is overexpressed in several types of cancers. Early clinical trials of Pfizer's PF-06650808, an anti-Notch3 antibody linked to a cytotoxic drug, showed efficacy against solid tumors.

== Mammalian evolution ==
An extensive cross-species investigation of the NOTCH3 gene has revealed unexpected natural diversity in a protein that is otherwise highly conserved among mammals. The analysis uncovered multiple cysteine-altering variants in jaguar a rare splice isoform in humans shared with a small number of other species, and a regulatory-region deletion in Brandt's bat.
