= Sialidase-4 =

Protein-coding gene in the species Homo sapiens

NEU4

Identifiers
- Aliases: NEU4, neuraminidase 4
- External IDs: OMIM: 608527; MGI: 2661364; GeneCards: NEU4
Enzyme activity
EC #	BRENDA	ExPASy	KEGG	MetaCyc
3.2.1.18	↗	↗	↗	↗

Gene location (Human)
Chr.	Chromosome 2 (human)
Band	2q37.3	Start	241,809,065 bp
Band	2q37.3	End	241,817,413 bp

Gene location (Mouse)
Chr.	Chromosome 1 (mouse)
Band	1|1 D	Start	93,948,173 bp
Band	1|1 D	End	93,956,056 bp
RNA expression pattern
Bgee	Human / Mouse (ortholog); Top expressed in: mucosa of transverse colon; right lobe of liver; substantia nigra; duodenum; temporal lobe; amygdala; hippocampus proper; hypothalamus; putamen; anterior cingulate cortex / Top expressed in: striatum of neuraxis; primary visual cortex; Cortex of frontal lobe; hypothalamus; superior frontal gyrus; dentate gyrus of hippocampal formation granule cell; cerebellar cortex; hippocampus proper; olfactory bulb; More reference expression data
BioGPS	n/a
Gene ontology
Molecular function	exo-alpha-(2->6)-sialidase activity; exo-alpha-(2->8)-sialidase activity; hydrolase activity, acting on glycosyl bonds; protein binding; exo-alpha-(2->3)-sialidase activity; hydrolase activity; exo-alpha-sialidase activity
Cellular component	organelle inner membrane; membrane; lysosomal lumen; lysosome; cytoplasm; intracellular membrane-bounded organelle
Biological process	glycosphingolipid metabolic process; lipid metabolism; lipid catabolic process; glycoprotein catabolic process; oligosaccharide catabolic process; metabolism; ganglioside catabolic process; carbohydrate metabolic process
Sources:Amigo / QuickGO
Orthologs
Databases	NCBI: entry; OMA: entry
Species	Human	Mouse
Entrez	129807	241159
Ensembl	ENSG00000204099; ENSG00000277926	ENSMUSG00000034000
UniProt	Q8WWR8	Q8BZL1
RefSeq (mRNA)	NM_080741; NM_001167599; NM_001167600; NM_001167601; NM_001167602	NM_173772; NM_001310769
RefSeq (protein)	NP_001161071; NP_001161072; NP_001161073; NP_001161074; NP_542779 NP_001161071.1; NP_001161072.1; NP_001161073.1; NP_001161074.1	NP_001297698; NP_776133
Location (UCSC)	Chr 2: 241.81 – 241.82 Mb	Chr 1: 93.95 – 93.96 Mb
PubMed search
- Wikidata
View/Edit Human	View/Edit Mouse

Sialidase-4 is an enzyme that in humans is encoded by the NEU4 gene.

== Function ==
This gene belongs to a family of glycohydrolytic enzymes which remove sialic acid residues from glycoproteins and glycolipids.

== Interactions ==
Sialidase-4 has been shown to interact with phospholipid scramblase 1.
