= Bacterial neuraminidase =

BNR/Asp-box repeat
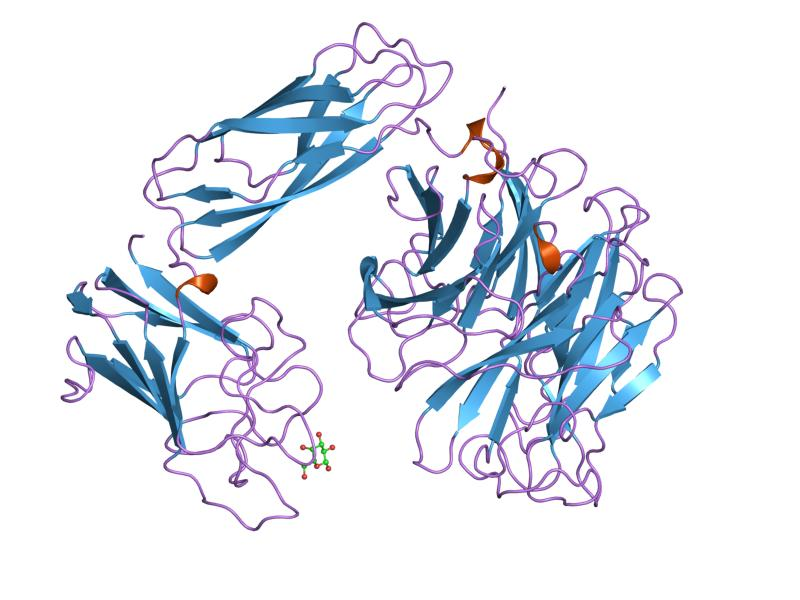
- Structure of a bacterial sialidase.

Identifiers
- Symbol: BNR
- Pfam: PF02012
- Pfam clan: CL0434
- InterPro: IPR002860
- SCOP2: 1euu / SCOPe / SUPFAM
Available protein structures:
- Pfam: structures / ECOD
- PDB: RCSB PDB; PDBe; PDBj
- PDBsum: structure summary
- PDB: 1dil, 1dim, 1eur, 1eus, 1eut, 1euu, 1kit, 1mr5, 1ms0, 1ms1, 1ms3, 1ms4, 1ms5, 1ms8, 1ms9, 1mz5, 1mz6, 1n1s, 1n1t, 1n1v, 1n1y, 1s0i, 1s0j, 1sli, 1sll, 1sqj, 1w0o, 1w0p, 1w8n, 1w8o, 1wcq, 1wcs, 2a75, 2ags, 2ah2, 2ber, 2bzd, 2ebs, 2fhr, 2jkb, 2sil, 2sim, 2sli, 2vw0, 2vw1, 2vw2, 3b69, 3b7f, 3sil, 3sli, 4sli

Bacterial neuraminidase is type of neuraminidase and a virulence factor for many bacteria including Bacteroides fragilis and Pseudomonas aeruginosa. Its function is to cleave a sialic acid residue off ganglioside-GM1 (a modulator of cell surface and receptor activity) turning it into asialo-GM1 to which type 4 pili (attachment factors) bind preferentially.
