= Sialidase-1 =

Protein-coding gene in the species Homo sapiens

NEU1
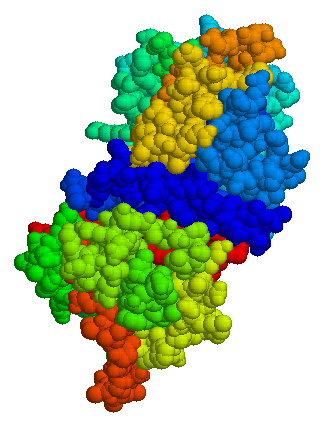

Identifiers
- Aliases: NEU1, NANH, NEU, SIAL1, neuraminidase 1 (lysosomal sialidase), neuraminidase 1
- External IDs: OMIM: 608272; MGI: 97305; GeneCards: NEU1
Enzyme activity
EC #	BRENDA	ExPASy	KEGG	MetaCyc
3.2.1.18	↗	↗	↗	↗

Gene location (Human)
Chr.	Chromosome 6 (human)
Band	6p21.33	Start	31,857,659 bp
Band	6p21.33	End	31,862,905 bp

Gene location (Mouse)
Chr.	Chromosome 17 (mouse)
Band	17 B1|17 18.48 cM	Start	35,150,229 bp
Band	17 B1|17 18.48 cM	End	35,154,929 bp
RNA expression pattern
Bgee	Human / Mouse (ortholog); Top expressed in: islet of Langerhans; right adrenal cortex; bone marrow cell; left adrenal gland; placenta; left adrenal cortex; gallbladder; human kidney; duodenum; renal cortex / Top expressed in: right kidney; human kidney; proximal tubule; granulocyte; ileum; seminal vesicula; yolk sac; gallbladder; left colon; stroma of bone marrow; More reference expression data
BioGPS	n/a
Gene ontology
Molecular function	exo-alpha-(2->3)-sialidase activity; exo-alpha-(2->8)-sialidase activity; exo-alpha-(2->6)-sialidase activity; hydrolase activity; hydrolase activity, acting on glycosyl bonds; exo-alpha-sialidase activity; protein binding; alpha-sialidase activity
Cellular component	cytoplasmic vesicle; intracellular membrane-bounded organelle; lysosomal membrane; extracellular exosome; lysosome; plasma membrane; lysosomal lumen; cell junction; membrane; extracellular region; specific granule lumen; cytoplasm
Biological process	ganglioside catabolic process; lipid catabolic process; lipid metabolism; metabolism; oligosaccharide catabolic process; glycosphingolipid metabolic process; neutrophil degranulation; carbohydrate metabolic process
Sources:Amigo / QuickGO
Orthologs
Databases	NCBI: entry; OMA: entry
Species	Human	Mouse
Entrez	4758	18010
Ensembl	ENSG00000227129; ENSG00000184494; ENSG00000223957; ENSG00000234846; ENSG00000204386 ENSG00000234343; ENSG00000227315; ENSG00000228691	ENSMUSG00000007038
UniProt	Q99519	O35657
RefSeq (mRNA)	NM_000434	NM_010893
RefSeq (protein)	NP_000425	NP_035023
Location (UCSC)	Chr 6: 31.86 – 31.86 Mb	Chr 17: 35.15 – 35.15 Mb
PubMed search
- Wikidata
View/Edit Human	View/Edit Mouse

Sialidase-1, is a mammalian lysosomal neuraminidase enzyme which in humans is encoded by the NEU1 gene.

== Function ==
The protein SIALIDASE-1 encoded by the NEU-1 gene encodes the lysosomal enzyme SIALIDASE-1, which cleaves terminal sialic acid residues from substrates such as glycoproteins and glycolipids. In the lysosome, this enzyme is part of a heterotrimeric complex together with beta-galactosidase and cathepsin A (the latter also referred to as 'protective protein'). Mutations in this gene can lead to sialidosis.

== Clinical significance ==
Mutations in NEU1 leads to sialidosis, a rare lysosomal storage disease. Sialidase has also been shown to enhance recovery from spinal cord contusion injury when injected in rats.

== Interactions ==
NEU1 has been shown to interact with Cathepsin A.
