= Sialidase-3 =

Protein-coding gene in the species Homo sapiens

NEU3

Identifiers
- Aliases: NEU3, SIAL3, neuraminidase 3 (membrane sialidase), neuraminidase 3, membrane sialidase, neuraminidase 3
- External IDs: OMIM: 604617; MGI: 1355305; GeneCards: NEU3
Enzyme activity
EC #	BRENDA	ExPASy	KEGG	MetaCyc
3.2.1.18	↗	↗	↗	↗

Gene location (Human)
Chr.	Chromosome 11 (human)
Band	11q13.4	Start	74,988,134 bp
Band	11q13.4	End	75,018,893 bp

Gene location (Mouse)
Chr.	Chromosome 7 (mouse)
Band	7|7 E1	Start	99,460,646 bp
Band	7|7 E1	End	99,477,624 bp
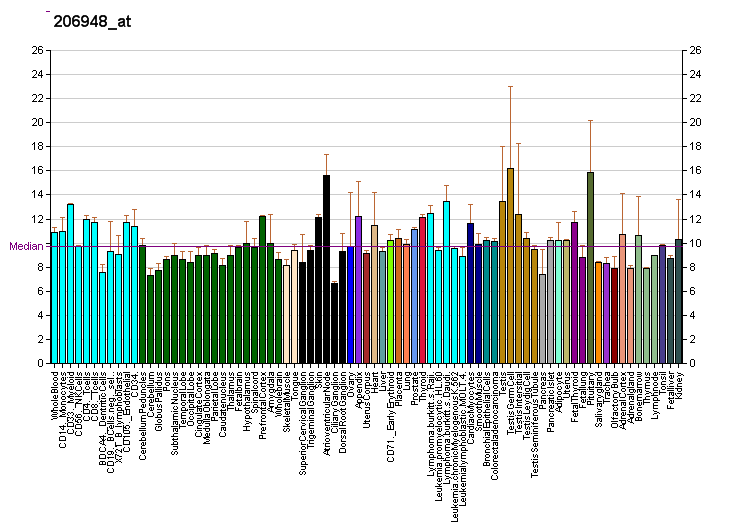

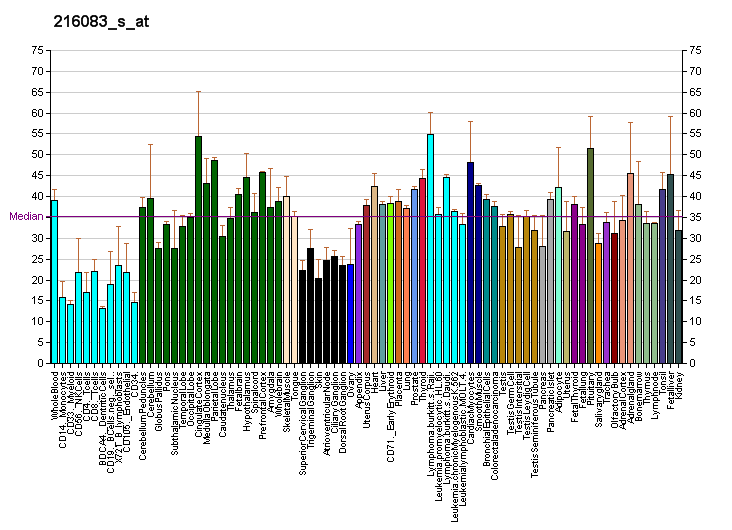
RNA expression pattern
Bgee	Human / Mouse (ortholog); Top expressed in: Skeletal muscle tissue of rectus abdominis; gastrocnemius muscle; muscle of thigh; right adrenal gland; left adrenal cortex; right adrenal cortex; sural nerve; biceps brachii; Skeletal muscle tissue of biceps brachii; right testis / Top expressed in: cumulus cell; epithelium of small intestine; thymus; embryo; muscle of thigh; left lung lobe; transitional epithelium of urinary bladder; ectoderm; otic vesicle; saccule; More reference expression data
BioGPS	More reference expression data
Gene ontology
Molecular function	alpha-sialidase activity; exo-alpha-(2->6)-sialidase activity; exo-alpha-(2->8)-sialidase activity; hydrolase activity, acting on glycosyl bonds; exo-alpha-(2->3)-sialidase activity; hydrolase activity; exo-alpha-sialidase activity
Cellular component	cytoplasm; intracellular membrane-bounded organelle; membrane; plasma membrane; integral component of plasma membrane
Biological process	glycosphingolipid metabolic process; lipid metabolism; lipid catabolic process; oligosaccharide catabolic process; metabolism; ganglioside catabolic process; carbohydrate metabolic process
Sources:Amigo / QuickGO
Orthologs
Databases	NCBI: entry; OMA: entry
Species	Human	Mouse
Entrez	10825	50877
Ensembl	ENSG00000162139	ENSMUSG00000035239
UniProt	Q9UQ49	Q9JMH7
RefSeq (mRNA)	NM_006656	NM_016720
RefSeq (protein)	NP_006647; NP_001354789; NP_001354790; NP_001354791; NP_001354792 NP_001354793; NP_001354794; NP_001354795; NP_001354796	NP_057929
Location (UCSC)	Chr 11: 74.99 – 75.02 Mb	Chr 7: 99.46 – 99.48 Mb
PubMed search
- Wikidata
View/Edit Human	View/Edit Mouse

Sialidase-3 is an enzyme that in humans is encoded by the NEU3 gene.

== Function ==
This gene product belongs to a family of glycohydrolytic enzymes which remove sialic acid residues from glycoproteins and glycolipids. It is localized in the plasma membrane, and its activity is specific for gangliosides. It may play a role in modulating the ganglioside content of the lipid bilayer.

== Interactions ==
Sialidase-3 has been shown to interact with Grb2.
