= Leducq Foundation =

- Formation: 1996
- Founder: Jean Leducq and Sylviane Leducq
- Type: Private charitable foundation (501(c)(3))
- Headquarters: Nassau, Bahamas; Boston, Massachusetts, United States
- Location: International
- Method: Scientific grants, venture philanthropy
- Fields: Cardiovascular and neurovascular disease research
- Key people: Sylviane Leducq (President of the Board, 2002–2013)
- Subsidiaries: Broadview Ventures, Inc.; Longview Healthcare Ventures
- Website: www.fondationleducq.org
- Remarks: Owns Ehlers Estate vineyard (Napa Valley, California)

The Leducq organization comprises the Leducq Charitable Trust and Leducq Foundation, both based in the Bahamas, the United States–based Leducq Foundation for Cardiovascular Research, a not-for-profit private foundation under the 501(c)(3) tax code, and Broadview Ventures, Inc. and Longview Healthcare Ventures, both part of a Boston, Massachusetts–based venture philanthropic program dedicated to accelerating the development of innovative technology for the diagnosis and treatment of cardiovascular disease and stroke through targeted investments. Leducq’s philanthropic mission is to improve human health through international efforts to combat cardiovascular disease and stroke.

The Leducq Foundation’s principal grant program, the International Networks of Excellence (INE) for Cardiovascular and Neurovascular Research, promotes internationally collaborative basic and translational research to advance the knowledge of cardiovascular and neurovascular disease. Since 2003, Leducq has distributed or committed more than $500 million to the INE program, awarding an average of four INE grants per year, with a current award of $8 million each over a five-year term. The program requires that the network leaders be from different continents, and participation is open to investigators worldwide. The Leducq Foundation Scientific Advisory Committee (SAC) is responsible for evaluating the scientific merit of applications to the INE program. It is composed equally of North American and European members, who are experts in cardiology, cardiac surgery, and neurovascular medicine.

Beginning in 2021 the Leducq Foundation has made an ongoing commitment to supporting research in rheumatic heart disease, a significant unmet medical need, particularly in low- and middle-income countries.

== History ==
Jean Leducq was a French entrepreneur who over the course of 50 years built a successful international linen supply business in Europe (ELIS) and North America (RUS). With his wife Sylviane Leducq, he created the Paris-based Fondation Leducq in November 1996 for the purpose of supporting medical research in the international context. Over the next several years they came to focus the mission of the foundation on heart disease and stroke, awarding $30M in single investigator grants in 1999 and 2001. In 2003, the foundation created its signature program, the Transatlantic Networks of Excellence in Cardiovascular Research, to support internationally collaborative research in heart disease and stroke. The Initial grants were awarded to research investigators from North American and Europe, the two continents where the Leducqs had lived and worked. The program, now under the name International Networks of Excellence, has been expanded to be open to researchers worldwide.

After Jean Leducq died in 2002, Sylviane Leducq served as President of the Board of Directors until her death in 2013. She oversaw the implementation of the International Networks of Excellence Program (INE), and the development of the venture philanthropy program Broadview Ventures. In 2009, Sylviane Leducq was awarded the Légion d’Honneur in recognition of her generosity and leadership of the foundation.

== Science ==
Research projects currently funded by the Foundation span the major areas of cardiovascular and neurovascular disease, including coronary artery disease, heart failure, stroke, cerebral small vessel disease, cardiac arrhythmias, hypertension, valvular heart disease, pulmonary hypertension, and congenital heart disease. Recently, Leducq researchers have played prominent roles in developing the use of stem cells for modeling human diseases, understanding the role of inflammation in atherosclerosis, advancing knowledge of renal physiology in hypertension, shedding insights into mechanisms of intracellular cholesterol transport, and elucidating mechanisms of cerebral small vessel disease. Leducq investigators have also identified Calcium Calmodulin Kinase II as a critical node in signaling pathways in atrial fibrillation and heart failure, provided new models of mitral valve disease, and implicated inflammation in post-stroke cognitive decline.

The Leducq rheumatic heart disease initiative, guided by expert advisory committees on vaccine development, and rheumatic fever biomarkers, has focused on three major activities. First is the identification of a biomarker for acute rheumatic fever which, notwithstanding its importance in the eventual development of rheumatic heart disease, remains difficult to diagnose. Second are efforts to develop a vaccine against the Group A streptococcus infection, which is causally implicated in rheumatic heart disease. The third activity is focused on development of novel prosthetic heart valve technologies that might provide durable and non-thrombogenic solutions for individuals already affected by rheumatic heart disease, and may be used at scale in areas where rheumatic heart disease is endemic.

== Structure ==
The Leducq organization includes the Leducq Charitable Trust and the Leducq Foundation, both based in the Bahamas, the United States–based Leducq Foundation for Cardiovascular Research, a not-for-profit private foundation under section 501(c)(3) of the Internal Revenue Code, and Broadview Ventures, Inc., a Boston, Massachusetts–based venture philanthropic program dedicated to accelerating the development of innovative technology for the diagnosis and treatment of cardiovascular disease and stroke through targeted investment. The Leducq Corporation, also located in Boston, MA, provides administrative services to the Leducq organization’s grant-making entities.

Broadview Ventures was created by the Leducq Charitable Trust in 2009 to enable the trust to provide seed and early-stage funding to companies developing innovative technologies for the diagnosis and treatment of cardiovascular disease and stroke. Broadview is mission, not-for-profit driven, with any investment return made under this program to be used either for additional Broadview investments or to provide further funding for Leducq Foundation programs. In 2018, The Leducq Charitable Trust developed a later-stage investment program, Longview Healthcare Ventures, which concentrates on follow-on investments in select Broadview program companies that are poised to achieve significant value-creating milestones with their next financing round. Longview focuses on clinical-stage companies, Series B – Series C, as a complement to Broadview’s continued dedication to Seed and Series A financings.

The bequest from the Leducq family to the charitable Leducq organization includes the Napa Valley, California, vineyard, Ehlers Estate, which supports the foundation’s philanthropic mission.
