= Sialidase-2 =

Protein-coding gene in the species Homo sapiens

NEU2
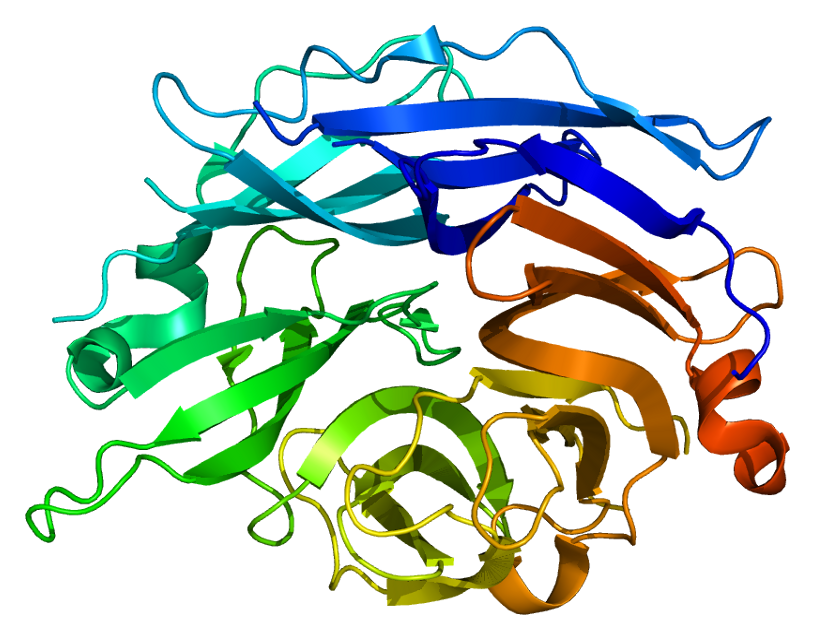

Identifiers
- Aliases: NEU2, SIAL2, neuraminidase 2 (cytosolic sialidase), neuraminidase 2
- External IDs: OMIM: 605528; MGI: 1344417; GeneCards: NEU2
Available structures
PDB	Ortholog search: PDBe RCSB
PDB	List of PDB id codes 1SNT, 1SO7, 1VCU, 2F0Z, 2F10, 2F11, 2F12, 2F13, 2F24, 2F25, 2F26, 2F27, 2F28, 2F29, 4NC5, 4NCS
Enzyme activity
EC #	BRENDA	ExPASy	KEGG	MetaCyc
3.2.1.18	↗	↗	↗	↗

Gene location (Human)
Chr.	Chromosome 2 (human)
Band	2q37.1	Start	233,032,672 bp
Band	2q37.1	End	233,035,057 bp

Gene location (Mouse)
Chr.	Chromosome 1 (mouse)
Band	1|1 D	Start	87,437,611 bp
Band	1|1 D	End	87,525,567 bp
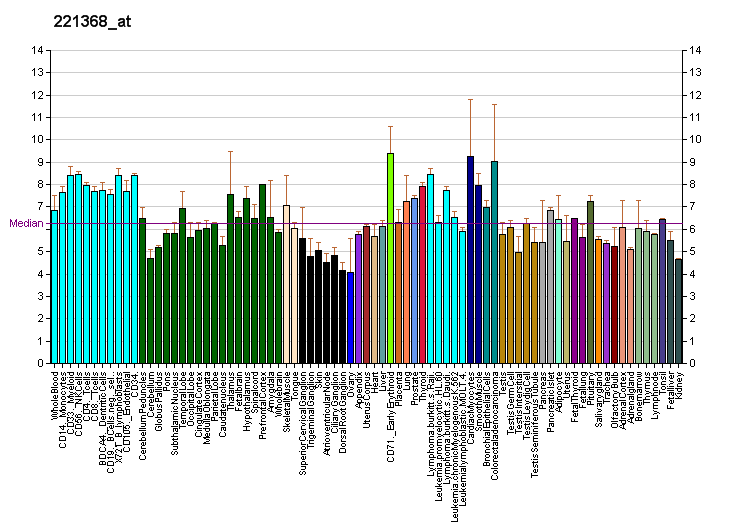
RNA expression pattern
Bgee	Human / Mouse (ortholog); Top expressed in: testicle; skin of leg; skin of abdomen; connective tissue; adipose tissue; nervous system; subcutaneous adipose tissue; tibial nerve / Top expressed in: temporal muscle; esophagus; triceps brachii muscle; right kidney; sternocleidomastoid muscle; respiratory epithelium; olfactory epithelium; vastus lateralis muscle; lip; muscle of thigh; More reference expression data
BioGPS	More reference expression data
Gene ontology
Molecular function	exo-alpha-(2->6)-sialidase activity; exo-alpha-(2->8)-sialidase activity; hydrolase activity, acting on glycosyl bonds; protein binding; exo-alpha-(2->3)-sialidase activity; hydrolase activity; exo-alpha-sialidase activity
Cellular component	cytoplasm; membrane; intracellular membrane-bounded organelle; cytosol; catalytic complex
Biological process	glycosphingolipid metabolic process; lipid metabolism; lipid catabolic process; oligosaccharide catabolic process; metabolism; ganglioside catabolic process; cellular oligosaccharide catabolic process; carbohydrate metabolic process
Sources:Amigo / QuickGO
Orthologs
Databases	NCBI: entry; OMA: entry
Species	Human	Mouse
Entrez	4759	23956
Ensembl	ENSG00000115488	ENSMUSG00000079434
UniProt	Q9Y3R4	Q9JMH3
RefSeq (mRNA)	NM_005383	NM_001160163; NM_001160164; NM_001160165; NM_015750
RefSeq (protein)	NP_005374	NP_001153635; NP_001153636; NP_001153637; NP_056565
Location (UCSC)	Chr 2: 233.03 – 233.04 Mb	Chr 1: 87.44 – 87.53 Mb
PubMed search
- Wikidata
View/Edit Human	View/Edit Mouse

Sialidase-2 is an enzyme that in humans is encoded by the NEU2 gene.

This gene belongs to a family of glycohydrolytic enzymes which remove sialic acid residues from glycoproteins and glycolipids. Expression studies in COS-7 cells confirmed that this gene encodes a functional sialidase. Its cytosolic localization was demonstrated by cell fractionation experiments.
