= Panče Naumov =

Macedonian chemist

- Панче Наумов
- Education: Ss. Cyril and Methodius University (BSc); Tokyo Institute of Technology (PhD)
- Known for: Dynamic molecular crystals
- Awards: Bessel Research Award (2015); Fellow, American Chemical Society (2021)
- Scientific career
- Fields: Solid-state chemistry; Crystal engineering; Photochemistry
- Workplaces: National Institute for Materials Science; Osaka University; Kyoto University; New York University Abu Dhabi; New York University

Panče Naumov (Macedonian: Панче Наумов) is a Macedonian chemist and professor of chemistry at New York University Abu Dhabi (NYUAD), where he directs the Center for Smart Engineering Materials (CSEM) and leads the Smart Materials Lab. He holds a cross-appointment as a Global Network Professor of Chemistry at New York University in New York City.

Naumov works on dynamic molecular crystals, crystalline organic solids that bend, jump, heal or otherwise respond mechanically to light, heat and other stimuli, a field for which he introduced the term crystal adaptronics. He is an external member of the Macedonian Academy of Sciences and Arts, a member of the European Academy of Sciences, and a member of the Mohammed bin Rashid Academy of Scientists, the national academy of sciences of the United Arab Emirates.

== Early life and education ==
Naumov is originally from Štip, in what is now North Macedonia. He completed his Bachelor of Science in chemistry at Ss. Cyril and Methodius University in Skopje in 1997. In 2000 he received a graduate fellowship from the Japanese Ministry of Education and Science, and he earned his PhD in chemistry and materials science from the Tokyo Institute of Technology in 2004.

== Career ==
Naumov was a research fellow at the National Institute for Materials Science in Tsukuba, Japan, from 2004 to 2007, and joined Osaka University as an associate professor (2007–2012) before a brief tenure as associate professor at Kyoto University (2012–2013).

In 2012, Naumov moved to New York University Abu Dhabi as an associate professor of chemistry, and was subsequently promoted to full professor with tenure. He is the founding director of the NYUAD Center for Smart Engineering Materials and heads its Smart Materials Lab, and holds a cross-appointment at the Molecular Design Institute in NYU's Department of Chemistry.

He founded the UAE International Chemical Sciences Chapter of the American Chemical Society in 2016, and is the founding president of the Emirates Crystallographic Society, the body that represents the United Arab Emirates in the European Crystallographic Association. He also serves as a councilor of the European Crystallographic Association and as a consultant to the International Union of Crystallography.

== Research ==
Naumov's research spans smart materials, crystal engineering, solid-state chemistry, crystallography, photochemistry, and mechanochemistry. In 2018, he introduced the term crystal adaptronics to describe molecular crystals capable of integrating sensing, information processing, and mechanical actuation, and later proposed the related concept of mechanophotonics. He has argued that such crystals can be treated as machines that convert light, heat, or chemical gradients directly into mechanical work.

=== Dynamic and responsive crystals ===
His group has investigated structural transitions associated with the thermosalient effect and reported related light-induced (photosalient) and force-induced (mechanosalient) phenomena in molecular crystals. Work from the group established that organic molecular crystals, long regarded as inherently stiff and brittle, can be designed to be elastically and plastically flexible. The group reported shape-memory effects in molecular crystals, and later self-healing crystals with recovery of about 95% of their original mechanical strength, extending the work to hybrid perovskite single crystals and to crystals that self-heal at cryogenic temperatures.

Naumov's group has also examined molecular crystals as light-to-mechanical-work transducers, the autonomous transport of water and particles across subliming crystal surfaces, spiral-shaped crystal actuators inspired by natural morphologies, and thermosalient-crystal-embedded "smart" membranes for self-cleaning desalination. The group's method for harvesting water from air was inspired by the hygroscopic salt excretions of the desert shrub Tamarix aphylla.

=== Structure determination ===
Naumov has determined the crystal structures of a number of compounds whose solid-state structures had previously remained unresolved. In 2009 his group reported the structure and spectroscopy of oxyluciferin, the light emitter of firefly bioluminescence. He has also reported the solid-state structure of sodium saccharinate hydrate, and the crystal structures of the neuraminidase inhibitors oseltamivir phosphate (Tamiflu) and zanamivir (Relenza).

== Editorial and professional service ==
Naumov has been an associate editor of the Journal of the American Chemical Society, handling solid-state chemistry, photochemistry, crystallography, and crystal engineering. He served on the International Advisory Board of Angewandte Chemie (2021–2024), and has served on the editorial or advisory boards of Chemistry – A European Journal, Chemistry – An Asian Journal, ChemNanoMat, SmartMat, FlexMat, Smart Molecules, and Wearable Electronics. He has also been a guest editor for the Proceedings of the National Academy of Sciences.

According to NYU Abu Dhabi, citing the Nature Index, Naumov's laboratory accounts for approximately 40–60 percent of the high-impact chemistry publications produced in the United Arab Emirates each year.

== Awards and honors ==
=== Academy memberships and fellowships ===
- Fellow, American Chemical Society (2021)
- Fellow, Royal Society of Chemistry
- External member, Macedonian Academy of Sciences and Arts (2022)
- Member, Mohammed bin Rashid Academy of Scientists
- Member, European Academy of Sciences (2026)

=== Awards and prizes ===
- Graduate fellowship, Japanese Ministry of Education and Science (2000)
- Human Frontier Science Program award (2011)
- Asian and Oceanian Photochemistry Association Prize (2014)
- Friedrich Wilhelm Bessel Research Award, Alexander von Humboldt Foundation (2015)
- Radcliffe Fellowship, Radcliffe Institute for Advanced Study, Harvard University (2018)
- Hans and Marlies Zimmer International Scholar Award (2020)
- UAE "golden visa" for outstanding contributions to the country (2020)

== Selected publications ==
- Naumov, P.; Chizhik, S.; Panda, M. K.; Nath, N. K.; Boldyreva, E. "Mechanically Responsive Molecular Crystals". Chemical Reviews 2015, 115, 12440–12490. doi:10.1021/acs.chemrev.5b00398
- Naumov, P.; Karothu, D. P.; Ahmed, E.; Catalano, L.; Commins, P.; Mahmoud Halabi, J.; Al-Handawi, M. B.; Li, L. "The Rise of the Dynamic Crystals". Journal of the American Chemical Society 2020, 142, 13256–13272. doi:10.1021/jacs.0c05440
- Panda, M. K.; Ghosh, S.; Yasuda, N.; Moriwaki, T.; Mukherjee, G. D.; Reddy, C. M.; Naumov, P. "Spatially Resolved Analysis of Short-Range Structure Perturbations in a Plastically Bent Molecular Crystal". Nature Chemistry 2015, 7, 65–72. doi:10.1038/nchem.2123
- Ahmed, E.; Karothu, D. P.; Warren, M.; Naumov, P. "Shape-Memory Effects in Molecular Crystals". Nature Communications 2019, 10, 3723. doi:10.1038/s41467-019-11612-z
- Naumov, P.; Ozawa, Y.; Ohkubo, K.; Fukuzumi, S. "Structure and Spectroscopy of Oxyluciferin, the Light Emitter of the Firefly Bioluminescence". Journal of the American Chemical Society 2009, 131, 11590–11605. doi:10.1021/ja904309q
- Mahmoud Halabi, J.; Ahmed, E.; Sofela, S.; Naumov, P. "Performance of Molecular Crystals in Conversion of Light to Mechanical Work". Proceedings of the National Academy of Sciences 2021, 118, e2020604118. doi:10.1073/pnas.2020604118
- Mahmoud Halabi, J.; Al-Handawi, M. B.; Ceballos, R.; Naumov, P. "Intersectional Effects of Crystal Features on the Actuation Performance of Dynamic Molecular Crystals". Journal of the American Chemical Society 2023, 145, 12173–12180. doi:10.1021/jacs.3c02184
- Al-Handawi, M. B.; Commins, P.; Dinnebier, R. E.; Abdellatief, M.; Li, L.; Naumov, P. "Harvesting of Aerial Humidity with Natural Hygroscopic Salt Excretions". Proceedings of the National Academy of Sciences 2023, 120, e2313134120. doi:10.1073/pnas.2313134120
- Ding, C.; Tang, B.; Zhou, Y.; Jin, B.; Commins, P.; Al-Handawi, M. B.; Li, L.; Naumov, P.; Zhang, H. "Cryogenically Self-Healing Organic Crystals". Nature Materials 2026, 25, 285–293. doi:10.1038/s41563-025-02411-7
