= Peter Colman =

Australian biologist

Peter Colman AC FRS FAA FTSE
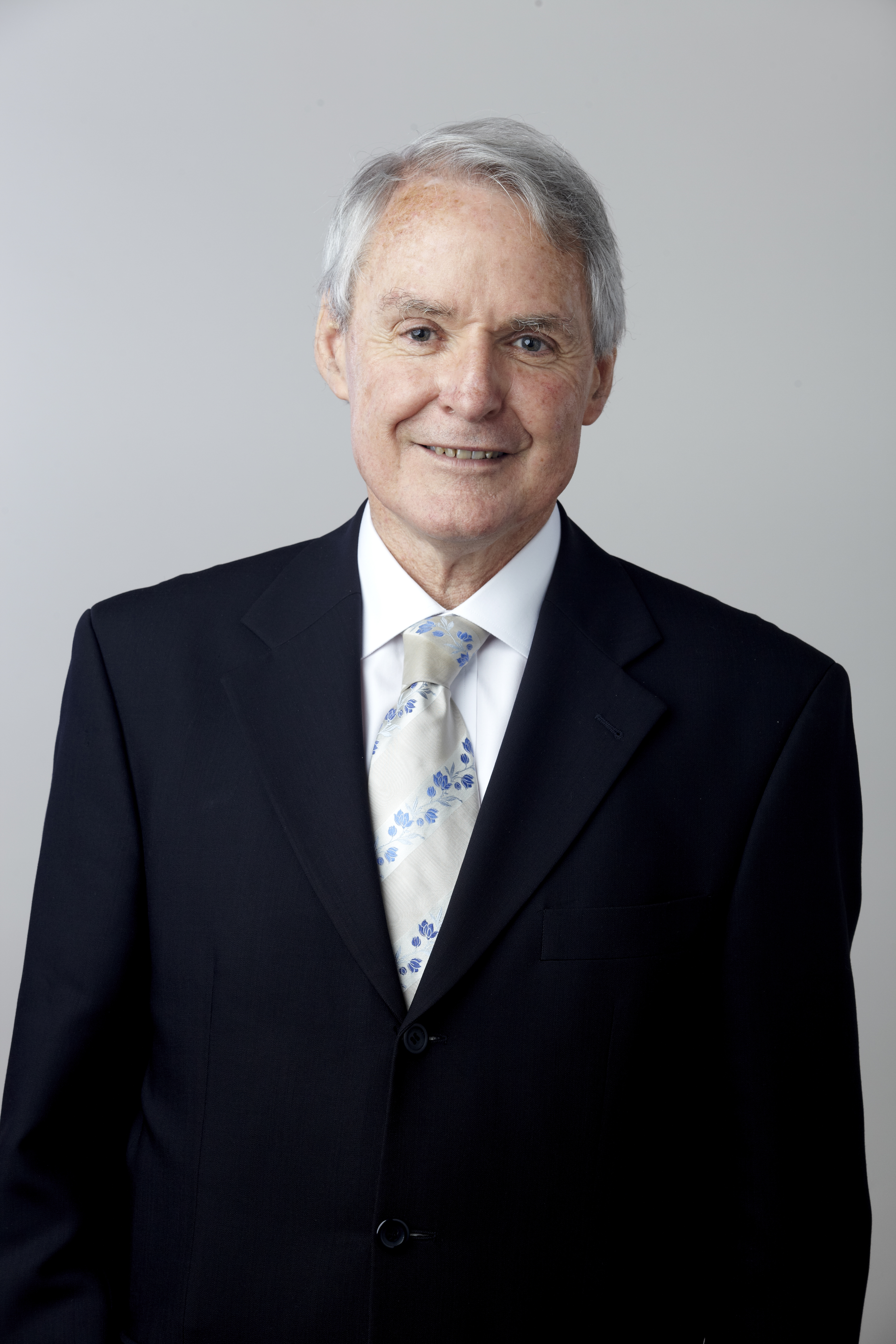
- Peter Colman at the Royal Society admissions day in 2014
- Born: Peter Malcolm Colman; 3 April 1944 (age 82); Adelaide
- Education: University of Adelaide (BSc, PhD)
- Known for: Zanamivir (Relenza); Oseltamivir (Tamiflu)
- Awards: Florey Medal (2004); Centenary Medal (2001); James Cook Medal (1999); Australia Prize (1996)
- Scientific career
- Fields: Structural biology; Viral neuraminidases
- Workplaces: University of Oregon; University of Sydney; University of Melbourne; La Trobe University; Walter and Eliza Hall Institute of Medical Research; CSIRO
- Thesis: The physical structure of two parabanic acid complexes and an investigation of short intermolecular carbon-oxygen contacts (1969)
- Doctoral advisor: Harry Medlin
- Website: www.wehi.edu.au/people/peter-colman

Peter Malcolm Colman (born 1944) is the head of the structural biology division at the Walter and Eliza Hall Institute of Medical Research in Melbourne, Australia.

== Education ==
Colman was educated at the University of Adelaide, where he received a Bachelor of Science degree in physics in 1966 and a PhD in 1969 for research on the chemical structure of parabanic acid complexes supervised by Harry Medlin.

== Research and career ==
Colman's research interests are in structural biology, especially of human B-cell lymphoma 2 (BCL-2). Colman determined the three-dimensional structure of the influenza virus neuraminidase and, in one of the earliest cases of structure-based drug design, discovered zanamivir, the first-in-class neuraminidase inhibitor for influenza. His subsequent structural studies on resistance to this drug class suggested how to design drugs against moving targets. His discoveries underpin drug stockpiling for pandemic preparedness. He has made seminal contributions to structural studies of antibodies and antibody-antigen complexes. Recent work on apoptosis solves the long-standing problem of how pro-apoptotic Bax changes conformation to dimerise and then oligomerise and permeabilise the mitochondrial membrane, an essential step in the intrinsic cell-death pathway.

His work has been published in leading peer reviewed scientific journals including Nature, the Journal of Molecular Biology, and Nature Reviews Molecular Cell Biology.

=== Awards and honours ===
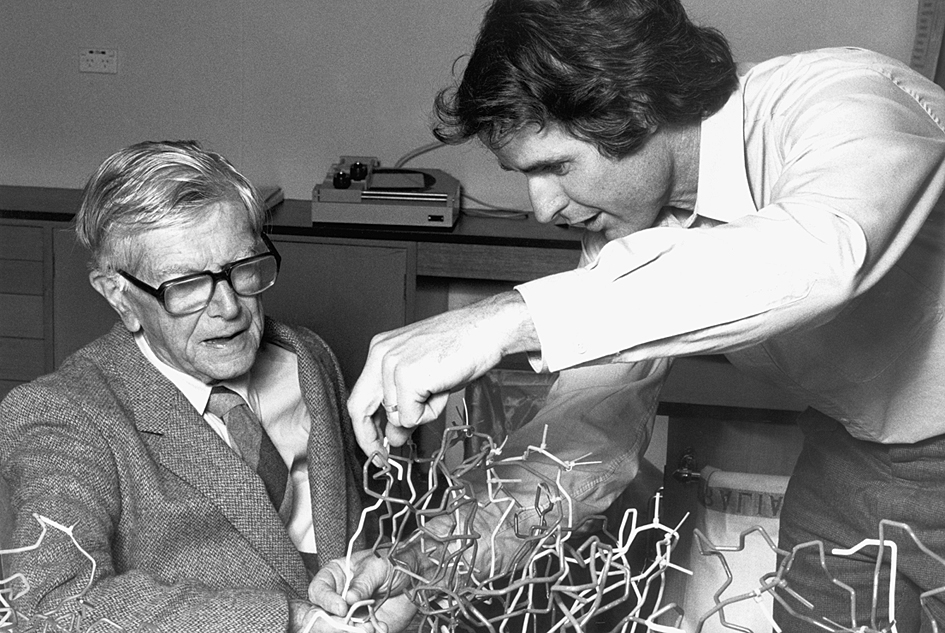
Peter Colman, showing his flu protein (neuraminidase) model to Frank Macfarlane Burnet .

In the Queen's 2017 Birthday Honours Colman was appointed a Companion of the Order of Australia (AC), Australia's highest civilian honour, "for eminent service to medical research, particularly in the fields of structural biology and medicinal chemistry, as a leader in the commercial translation of scientific discoveries, to professional organisations, and as a mentor of young scientists".

Colman was elected a Fellow of the Royal Society (FRS) in 2014. In 2001 he was awarded a Centenary Medal "For service to Australian society and science in structural biology". Colman was also elected a Fellow of the Australian Academy of Science in 1989 and a Fellow of the Australian Academy of Technological Sciences and Engineering in 1997. He was awarded the Lemberg Medal in 1988 and the Macfarlane Burnet Medal and Lecture in 1995.
