= Molecular Discovery =

Software Industry

Molecular Discovery Ltd
- Company type: Ltd
- Industry: Life sciences
- Founded: 1984
- Founder: Prof. Peter Goodford
- Headquarters: Borehamwood
- Website: www.moldiscovery.com

Molecular Discovery Ltd is a software company working in the area of drug discovery.

Founded in 1984 by Peter Goodford, its aim was to provide the GRID software to scientists working in the field of Drug Design, and enabled one of the first examples of rational drug design with the discovery of Zanamivir in 1989. In combination with statistical methods such as GOLPE, GRID's method of modeling molecular interaction (known as a "forcefield") can also be used to perform 3D-QSAR.

In the last decade, the GRID forcefield has been applied to other areas of drug discovery, including virtual screening, scaffold-hopping, ADME and pharmacokinetic modelling, optimisation of metabolic stability and metabolite prediction, as well as pKa and tautomer modelling.

Molecular Discovery manages a Cytochrome P450 Consortium aimed at generating a large set of homogeneous experimental data for human metabolism, allowing the development of predictive in silico models.

== Products ==
- GRID, a program for rational or structure-based design using molecular interaction fields
- MetaSite, a program for predicting metabolic "hotspots" or "soft spots" and subsequent metabolite formation
- Mass-MetaSite, a program for identifying metabolites based on experimental LC-MSMS data
- WebMetaBase, a program for storing, visualising, and data-mining the results from Mass-MetaSite
- VolSurf+, a program for modelling pharmacokinetic or ADME properties
- SHOP, a program for scaffold replacement
- MoKa, a program for modelling pKa and tautomerisation
- Pentacle, a program for 3D-QSAR (an update of Almond)
- FLAP, a program for virtual screening, pharmacophore modelling, docking, water prediction, and 3D-QSAR
