= Harry Medlin =

Australian scientist and university official (1920–2013)

Lieutenant (Temporary Captain) Dr Harry Medlin

Acting Deputy Chancellor / Emeritus Senior Deputy Chancellor of the University of Adelaide
- In office 1997–1997
- Chancellor: William (Bill) Scammell
- Preceded by: DC Mervyn Smith
- Succeeded by: DC Janine Haines

Senior Deputy Chancellor of the University of Adelaide
- In office 1984–1996 Serving with Deputy Chancellors; Sam Jacobs (1984–1993), Mervyn Smith (1994–1996)
- Chancellor: Dame Roma Mitchell; Bill Scammell
- Preceded by: Senior DC Dame; Roma Mitchell
- Succeeded by: Senior DC Jim Bettison

Deputy Chancellor of the University of Adelaide
- In office July 1978 – 1983 Serving with Senior Deputy Chancellor; Dame Roma Mitchell (until 1982)
- Chancellor: John Jefferson Bray
- Preceded by: Dame Roma Mitchell
- Succeeded by: Sam Jacobs
- Scientific career
- Born: Edwin Harry Medlin; 2 January 1920; Orroroo, South Australia
- Died: 6 March 2013 (aged 93)
- Other name: E. Harry Medlin
- Citizenship: Australia
- Education: University of Adelaide
- Fields: Physics
- Workplaces: University of Adelaide
- Thesis: (1956)
- Doctoral advisor: Stanley Gordon Tomlin
- Doctoral students: Peter Colman

LT (T/CAPT) Dr Edwin Harry Medlin (2 January 1920 – 6 March 2013) was Deputy Chancellor of the University of Adelaide from 1978 to 1997.

== Early life and education ==
Medlin was born in Orroroo on 2 January 1920. His younger brother was the philosopher and activist Brian Medlin. He was sent to school in Adelaide, then studied at the South Australian School of Mines and Industries from 1936 to 1939. He worked for the Adelaide Electric Supply Company and enlisted in the Australian Army prior to Australia joining the Second World War. He was commissioned in 1939 and promoted to Captain in 1940. He was serving in the 2/1st Fortress Company on the island of Timor when he was captured by the Japanese and held as a prisoner of war in Timor from 23 February 1942 and transferred to Batavia in Java in September 1942 until he was freed on 23 September 1945. He was awarded the Efficiency Medal and five campaign stars and medals before leaving the army in 1946. He returned to Adelaide on a troop train from Melbourne on 28 October 1945. He had returned to Australia on the Hospital ship Manunda after being recovered from the POW camp on 18 September and started the journey home via Singapore on 23 September 1945.

Medlin studied under the Commonwealth Reconstruction Training Scheme at the University of Adelaide, graduating with a Bachelor of Science degree in 1949, Honours in 1951 and a Ph.D. on X-ray crystallography in 1956.

== Career and research ==
Medlin began lecturing at the university in 1951, rising to Associate Professor by 1974. He retired in 1985, but remained in the University environment, including becoming inaugural chair of the Alumni Association. He was a member of the University Senate Standing Committee from 1965 to 1980, and the University Council from 1967 to 2003. He was Deputy Chancellor of the University from 1978 to 1997.

Medlin was awarded the degree of Doctor of the University in 1987, and the Centenary Medal in 2001 "For creative and productive involvement in all aspects of the work, life and culture of universities".

Medlin's interests included membership and administrative roles in the University of Adelaide Staff Association, the Federation of Australian University Staff Associations, the University of Adelaide Theatre Guild, the University of Adelaide Postgraduate Students Association (APSA) and the Adelaide University Union.
