= Brian Herbert Medlin =

Australian philosopher and anti-war activist (1927–2004)

Emeritus Professor Brian Herbert Medlin
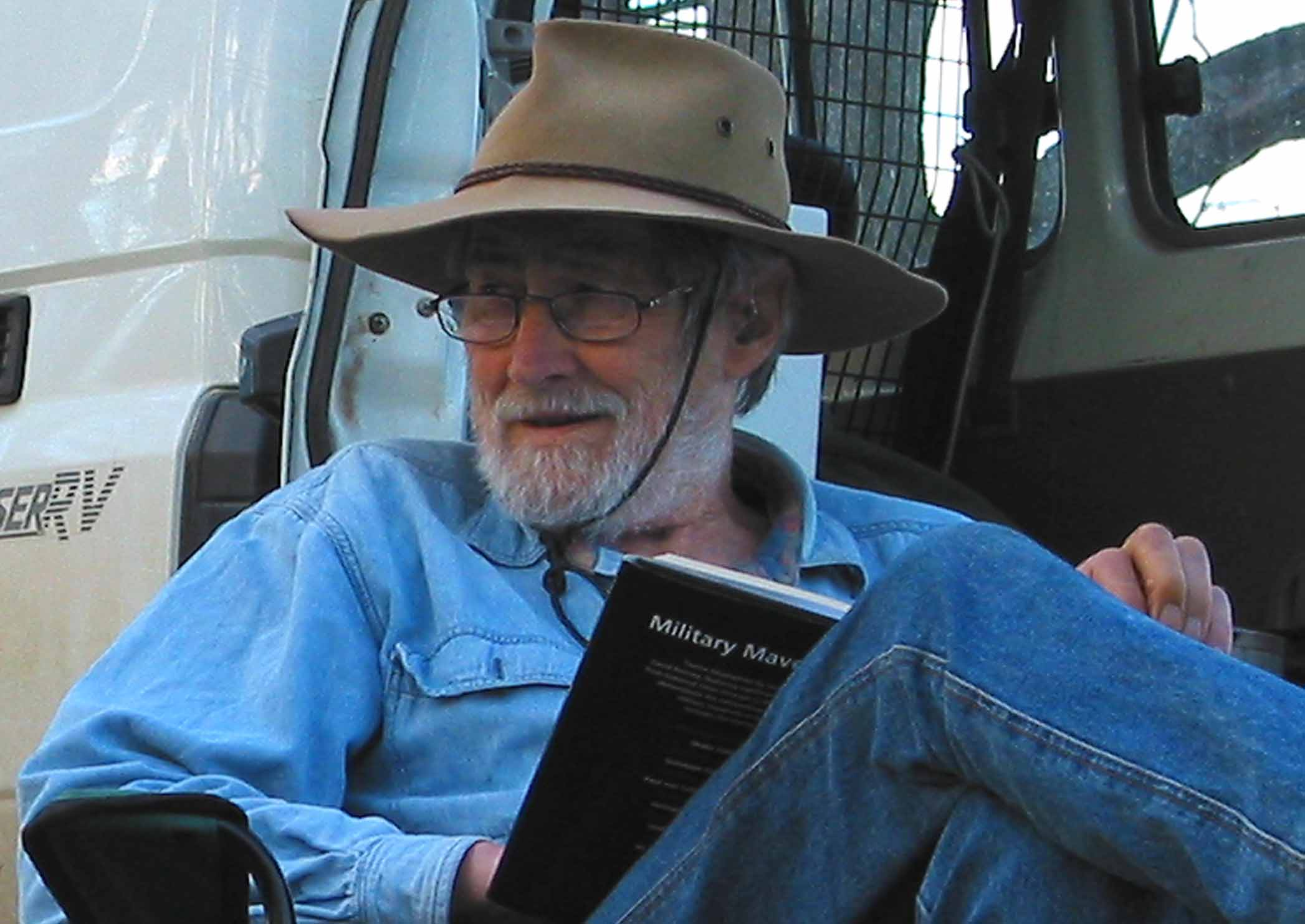
- Medlin picnicking at MacKenzie Creek Victoria. A self-portrait using his new digital camera. By permisson Estate Brian Medlin.
- Born: 1927; Orroroo, South Australia
- Died: 2004 (aged 76–77)
- Spouse: Christine Vick
- Relatives: Harry Medlin (brother)

Education
- Education: University of Adelaide, University of Oxford
- Alma mater: University of Adelaide

Philosophical work
- Institutions: Flinders University of South Australia
- Language: English
- Main interests: Philosophy of mind, Political philosophy, "applying philosophical methods to current problems and social issues"

Brian Herbert Medlin (1927–2004) was Foundation Professor of Philosophy at Flinders University in Adelaide, South Australia, from 1967 to 1988. He pioneered radical philosophy in Australian universities and played an active role in the campaign against the Vietnam war.

== Early life ==
Medlin was born in 1927 in Orroroo, South Australia. He was the younger brother of Harry Medlin, who became the Deputy Chancellor of Adelaide University. Medlin attended Richmond Primary School and Adelaide Technical High School. While at high school, Medlin was introduced to the philosophy of Bertrand Russell. He worked in the Northern Territory after graduating from secondary school, working in the pastoral industry in various capacities. He returned to Adelaide in the mid-1950s and while working as a teacher he studied English, Latin and Philosophy at the University of Adelaide, graduating in 1958 with first-class honours. During his university years he associated with writers such as John Bray, Charles Jury, Max Harris and Mary Martin. He received a scholarship to attend Oxford University, where he spent several years. He met the British writer and philosopher Iris Murdoch in the early 1960s and on his return to Australia corresponded with her for several decades. Their correspondence was a significant influence on Murdoch's depiction of Australia in her novels. During his Oxford years, he spent a year teaching philosophy in Ghana.

== Academic career ==
On his return to Australia in 1964, Medlin initially worked as a Reader at the University of Queensland. His early interests included the identity theory of mind and the nature of egoism. In 1967 he was appointed to the newly established Flinders University of South Australia as the Foundation Professor of Philosophy. In 1970, he adopted revolutionary socialism and with colleagues introduced new topics concerned with "applying philosophical methods to current problems and social issues". He developed innovative courses in women's studies, and politics and art, and instituted a student-staff consultative committee. He became known nationally as "an early leader in the ‘red shift’ in academic philosophy." In 1971 he was described as "spearheading the revolution" in philosophy which polarised academics in Australia when he draped a red flag over the podium at the conference of the Australian Association of Philosophers. He retired from Flinders in 1988, after a serious motorcycle accident in 1983 had long-term effects on his health. He was awarded the title of Emeritus Professor. Medlin's influence is attested by obituaries published in the national daily Australian newspaper and in the Australian Federal Senate.

== Activism ==
Medlin was strongly opposed to Australia's participation in the Vietnam War. He was chairman of the campaign for peace movement in South Australia. Medlin played a leading role with other activists such as Lynn Arnold in the anti-war campaign. He was arrested during a moratorium march in September 1970 and imprisoned for three weeks. During this time, his supporters kept a candelit vigil outside Adelaide jail. These experiences contributed to his influential course on politics and the arts taught at Flinders University, which prompted the formation of the well-known Australian progressive rock band Redgum. Over many years Medlin was subject to covert surveillance by ASIO for his activism and radicalism.

== Later career ==
After his retirement from Flinders University, Medlin moved to Victoria with his wife, Christine Vick, and spent some years regenerating a 10-acre property at Wimmera with native vegetation. He retained an interest in many subjects including natural history, literature, current affairs and photography. He died in 2004.

== Writings ==
In 1957, while still studying at Adelaide University, Medlin published an article titled "Ultimate principles and ethical egoism" that continues to be seen as a significant contribution to debates about egoism. For example In 2007, Stephen R.C. Hicks wrote, in reference to this essay, "Brian Medlin was representative" of his generation in tending to skepticism and non-naturalism. His 1963 article "The origin of motion" is discussed in detail in N. Strobach's "The Moment of Change" (2013). Medlin also wrote poetry, which was widely published in Australian periodicals through the 1950s and 1960s, and short fiction, often using the pseudonym Timothy Tregonning. Many unpublished works are in the Brian Medlin Collection at Flinders University. A collection of his essays, stories and poems was published by Wakefield Press in 2021 under the title The Level-Headed Revolutionary.

== Bibliography ==
=== Archive ===
Brian Medlin Collection, Special Collections, Flinders University Library, Bedford Park, South Australia.

=== Books ===
Human Nature Human Survival. Adelaide: Board of Research, Flinders University, 1992.

Never Mind about the Bourgeoisie: The Correspondence between Iris Murdoch and Brian Medlin 1976-1995. Edited by Gillian Dooley and Graham Nerlich. Newcastle on Tyne: Cambridge Scholars Press, 2014.

The Level-Headed Revolutionary: Essays, Stories and Poems by Brian Medlin. Edited by Gillian Dooley, Wallace McKitrick and Susan Petrilli. Adelaide: Wakefield Press, Forthcoming 2021.
