= Laninamivir =

Chemical compound

Clinical data
- Routes of administration: Inhalation
- ATC code: J05AH04 (WHO)

Identifiers
- IUPAC name: (4S,5R,6R)-5-acetamido-4-carbamimidamido-6-[(1R,2R)-3-hydroxy-2-methoxypropyl]-5,6-dihydro-4H-pyran-2-carboxylic acid
- CAS Number: 203120-17-6
- PubChem CID: 502272
- ChemSpider: 439182
- UNII: B408IW3GL5
- ChEMBL: ChEMBL466246
- CompTox Dashboard (EPA): DTXSID60942457

Chemical and physical data
- Formula: C_{13}H_{22}N_{4}O_{7}
- Molar mass: 346.340 g·mol^{−1}
- 3D model (JSmol): Interactive image
- SMILES: O=C(O)C=1O[C@@H]([C@H](OC)[C@H](O)CO)[C@H](NC(=O)C)[C@@H](/N=C(\N)N)C=1
- InChI: InChI=1S/C13H22N4O7/c1-5(19)16-9-6(17-13(14)15)3-8(12(21)22)24-11(9)10(23-2)7(20)4-18/h3,6-7,9-11,18,20H,4H2,1-2H3,(H,16,19)(H,21,22)(H4,14,15,17)/t6-,7+,9+,10+,11+/m0/s1; Key:QNRRHYPPQFELSF-CNYIRLTGSA-N

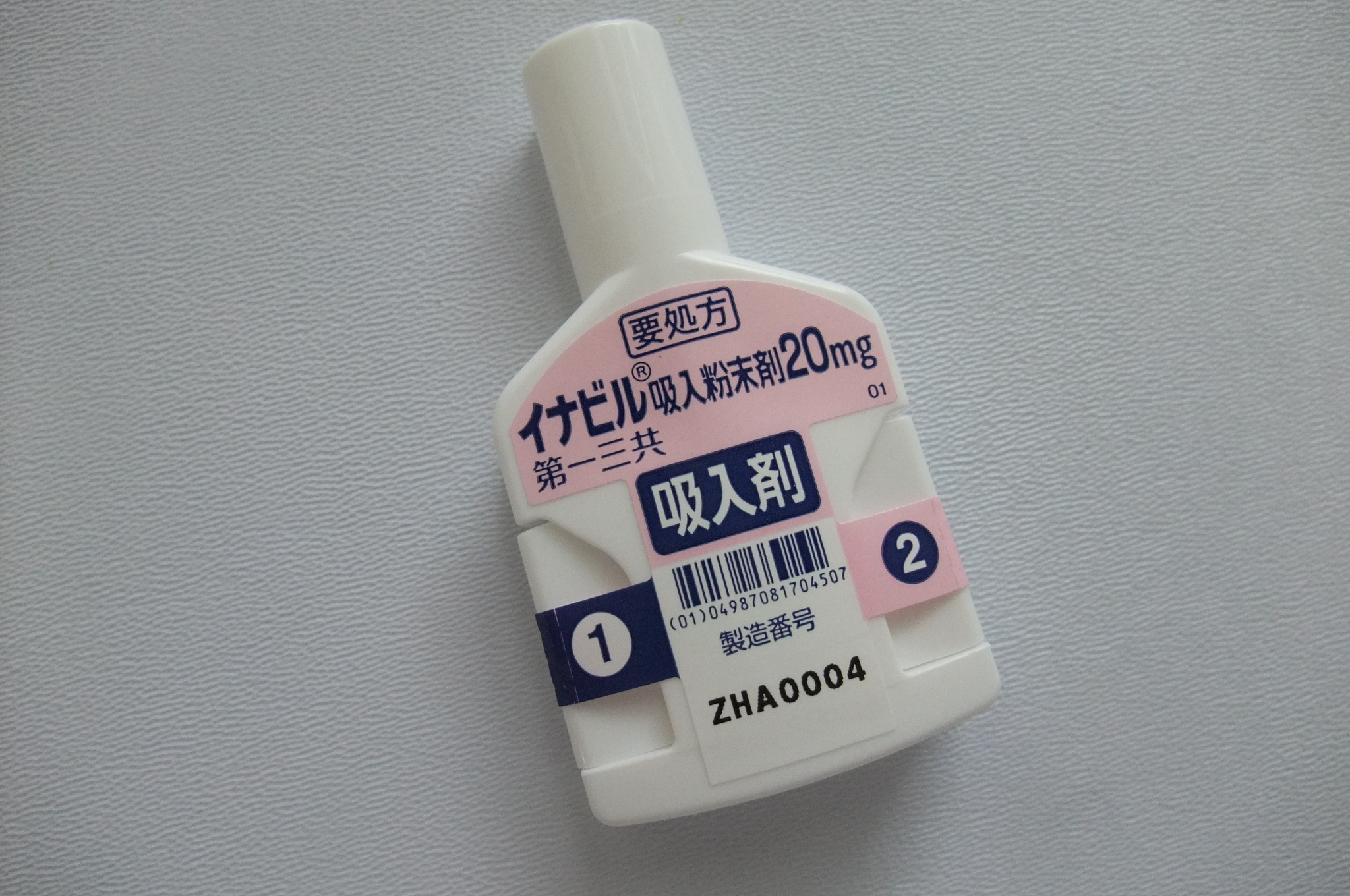
Inavir

Laninamivir (CS-8958) is a neuraminidase inhibitor that is a drug used for the treatment and prophylaxis of Influenzavirus A and Influenzavirus B. It is currently in Phase III clinical trials. It is a long-acting neuraminidase inhibitor administered by inhalation.

Laninamivir was approved for influenza treatment in Japan in 2010 and for prophylaxis in 2013. It is currently marketed under the name Inavir by Daiichi Sankyo. Biota Pharmaceuticals and Daiichi Sankyo co-own Laninamivir. On 1 April 2011, BARDA awarded up to an estimated U$231m to Biota Pharmaceuticals (Formerly Biota Holdings Ltd) wholly owned subsidiary, Biota Scientific Management Pty Ltd, for the advanced development of Laninamivir in the US. It is under clinical evaluations in other countries.
