= Zanamivir =

Influenza medication

Clinical data
- Pronunciation: /zəˈnæmɪvɪər/
- Trade names: Relenza, others
- AHFS/Drugs.com: Monograph
- MedlinePlus: a699021
- License data: US DailyMed: Zanamivir
- Pregnancy category: AU: B1
- Routes of administration: Inhalation, intravenous
- ATC code: J05AH01 (WHO)

Legal status
- Legal status: AU: S4 (Prescription only); UK: POM (Prescription only); US: ℞-only; EU: Rx-only

Pharmacokinetic data
- Bioavailability: 2% (oral)
- Protein binding: <10%
- Metabolism: Negligible
- Elimination half-life: 2.5–5.1 hours
- Excretion: Kidney

Identifiers
- IUPAC name: (2R,3R,4S)-4-guanidino-3-(prop-1-en-2-ylamino)-2-((1R,2R)-1,2,3-trihydroxypropyl)-3,4-dihydro-2H-pyran-6-carboxylic acid
- CAS Number: 139110-80-8
- PubChem CID: 60855
- DrugBank: DB00558
- ChemSpider: 54842
- UNII: L6O3XI777I
- KEGG: D00902
- ChEBI: CHEBI:50663
- ChEMBL: ChEMBL222813
- PDB ligand: ZMR (PDBe, RCSB PDB)
- CompTox Dashboard (EPA): DTXSID0023749
- ECHA InfoCard: 100.218.632

Chemical and physical data
- Formula: C_{12}H_{20}N_{4}O_{7}
- Molar mass: 332.313 g·mol^{−1}
- 3D model (JSmol): Interactive image
- SMILES: O=C(O)C=1O[C@@H]([C@H](O)[C@H](O)CO)[C@H](NC(=O)C)[C@@H](/N=C(\N)N)C=1
- InChI: InChI=1S/C12H20N4O7/c1-4(18)15-8-5(16-12(13)14)2-7(11(21)22)23-10(8)9(20)6(19)3-17/h2,5-6,8-10,17,19-20H,3H2,1H3,(H,15,18)(H,21,22)(H4,13,14,16)/t5-,6+,8+,9+,10+/m0/s1; Key:ARAIBEBZBOPLMB-UFGQHTETSA-N

Zanamivir, sold under the brand name Relenza among others, is an anti-viral medication used to treat and prevent influenza caused by influenza A and influenza B viruses. It is a neuraminidase inhibitor and was developed by the Australian biotech firm Biota Holdings. It was licensed to Glaxo Wellcome in 1990 and approved in the US in 1999, only for use as a treatment for influenza. In 2006, it was approved for prevention of influenza A and B. Zanamivir is the first neuraminidase inhibitor commercially developed. It was developed by GlaxoSmithKline.

== Medical uses ==
Zanamivir is used for the treatment of infections caused by influenza A and influenza B viruses, but in otherwise-healthy individuals, benefits overall appear to be small. It decreases the risk of one contracting symptomatic, but not asymptomatic influenza. The combination of diagnostic uncertainty, the risk for virus strain resistance, possible side effects and financial cost outweigh the small benefits of zanamivir for the prophylaxis and treatment of healthy individuals.

=== Treatment ===
In otherwise-healthy individuals, benefits overall appear to be small. Zanamivir shortens the duration of symptoms of influenza-like illness (unconfirmed influenza or 'the flu') by less than a day. In children with asthma there was no clear effect on the time to first alleviation of symptoms. Whether it affects the risk of one's need to be hospitalized or the risk of death is not clear. There is no proof that zanamivir reduced hospitalizations or pneumonia and other complications of influenza, such as bronchitis, middle ear infection, and sinusitis. Zanamivir did not reduce the risk of self reported investigator mediated pneumonia or radiologically confirmed pneumonia in adults. The effect on pneumonia in children was also not significant.

=== Prevention ===
Low to moderate evidence indicates it decreases the risk of one's getting influenza by 1 to 12% in those exposed. Prophylaxis trials showed that zanamivir reduced the risk of symptomatic influenza in individuals and households, but there was no evidence of an effect on asymptomatic influenza or on other, influenza-like illnesses. Also there was no evidence of reduction of risk of person-to-person spread of the influenza virus. The evidence for a benefit in preventing influenza is weak in children, with concerns of publication bias in the literature.

=== Resistance ===
As of 2009, no influenza had shown any signs of resistance in the US. A meta-analysis from 2011 found that zanamivir resistance had been rarely reported. Antiviral resistance can emerge during or after treatment with antivirals in certain people (e.g., immunosuppressed). In 2013 genes expressing resistance to zanamivir (and oseltamivir) were found in Chinese patients infected with avian influenza A H7N9.

== Adverse effects ==
Dosing is limited to the inhalation route. This restricts its usage, as treating asthmatics could induce bronchospasms. In 2006, the US Food and Drug Administration (FDA) found that breathing problems (bronchospasm), including deaths, were reported in some patients after the initial approval of Relenza. Most of these patients had asthma or chronic obstructive pulmonary disease. Relenza therefore was not recommended for treatment or prophylaxis of seasonal influenza in individuals with asthma or chronic obstructive pulmonary disease. In 2009, the zanamivir package insert contains precautionary information regarding risk of bronchospasm in patients with respiratory disease. GlaxoSmithKline (GSK) and FDA notified healthcare professionals of a report of the death of a patient with influenza having received zanamivir inhalation powder, which was solubilized and administered by mechanical ventilation.

In adults there was no increased risk of reported adverse events in trials. There was little evidence of the possible harms associated with the treatment of children with zanamivir. Zanamivir has not been known to cause toxic effects and has low systemic exposure to the human body.

== Mechanism of action ==
Zanamivir works by binding to the active site of the neuraminidase protein, rendering the influenza virus unable to escape its host cell and infect others. It is also an inhibitor of influenza virus replication in vitro and in vivo. In clinical trials, zanamivir was found to reduce the time-to-symptom resolution by 1.5 days if therapy was started within 48 hours of the onset of symptoms.

The bioavailability of zanamivir is 2%. After inhalation, zanamivir is concentrated in the lungs and oropharynx, where up to 15% of the dose is absorbed and excreted in urine.

== History ==
Zanamivir was first made in 1989 by scientists led by Peter Colman and Joseph Varghese at the Australian CSIRO, in collaboration with the Victorian College of Pharmacy and Monash University. Zanamivir was the first of the neuraminidase inhibitors. The discovery was initially funded by the Australian biotechnology company Biota and was part of Biota's ongoing program to develop antiviral agents through rational drug design. Its strategy relied on the availability of the structure of influenza neuraminidase by X-ray crystallography. It was also known, as far back as 1974, that 2-deoxy-2,3-didehydro-N-acetylneuraminic acid (DANA), a sialic acid analogue, is an inhibitor of neuraminidase.

Computational chemistry techniques were used to probe the active site of the enzyme, in an attempt to design derivatives of DANA that would bind tightly to the amino acid residues of the catalytic site, so would be potent and specific inhibitors of the enzyme. The GRID software by Molecular Discovery was used to determine energetically favourable interactions between various functional groups and residues in the catalytic site canyon. This investigation showed a negatively charged zone occurs in the neuraminidase active site that aligns with the C_{4} hydroxyl group of DANA. This hydroxyl is, therefore, replaced with a positively charged amino group; the 4-amino DANA was shown to be 100 times better as an inhibitor than DANA, owing to the formation of a salt bridge with a conserved glutamic acid (119) in the active site. Glu 119 was also noticed to be at the bottom of a conserved pocket in the active site that is just big enough to accommodate the larger, but more basic guanidine functional group. Zanamivir, a transition-state analogue inhibitor of neuraminidase, was the result.

In 1999, the zanamivir was approved in the US and the European Union for the treatment of influenza A and B. The FDA advisory committee recommended by a vote 13 to 4 that it should not be approved, because it lacked efficacy and was no more effective than placebo when the patients were on other drugs such as paracetamol. But the FDA leadership overruled the committee. In 2006, zanamivir was approved in the US and the European Union for prevention of influenza A and B.
