= Oseltamivir =

Antiviral medication used against influenza

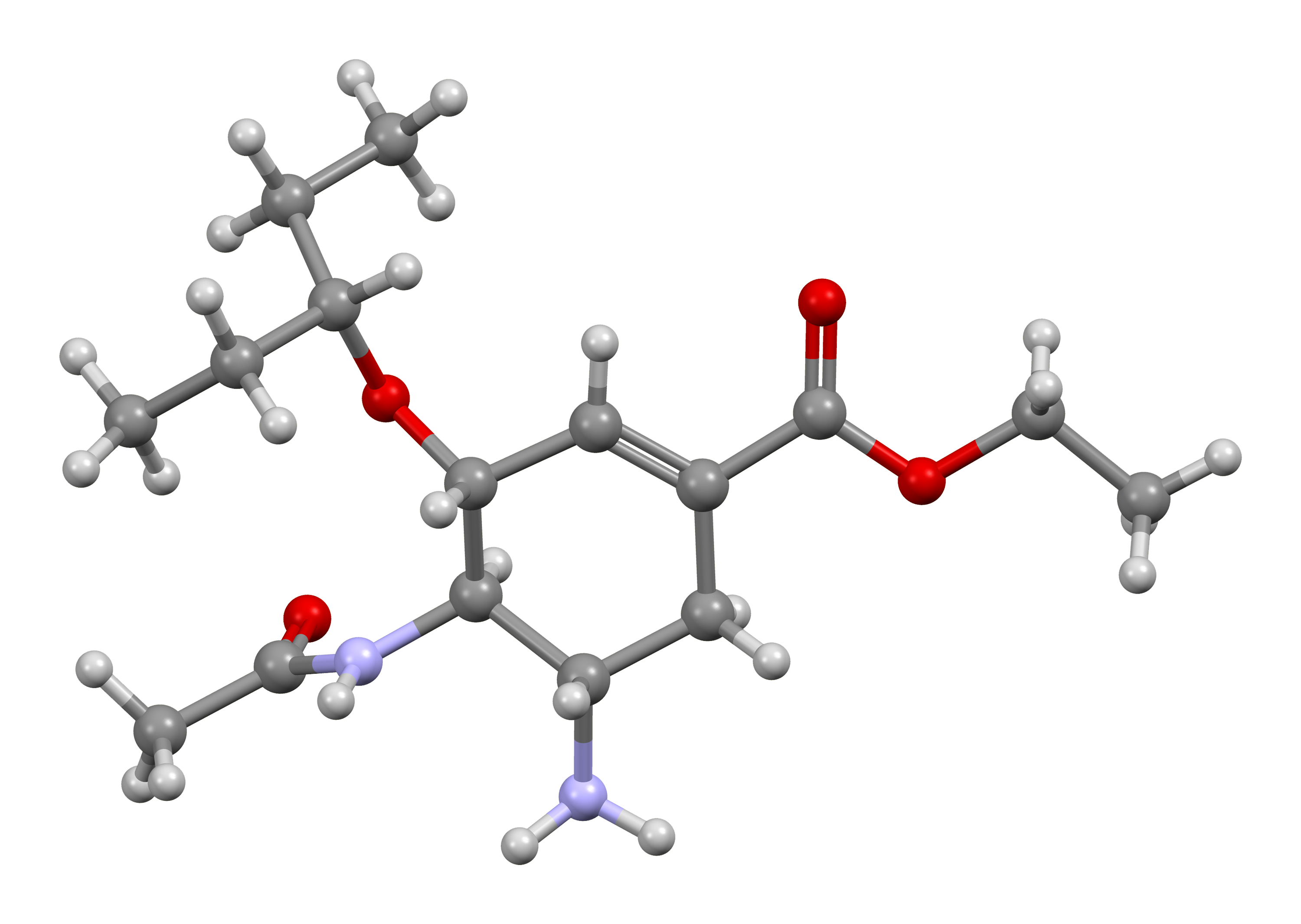

Clinical data
- Pronunciation: /ɒsəlˈtæmɪvɪər/
- Trade names: Tamiflu, others
- Other names: GS-4104
- AHFS/Drugs.com: Monograph
- MedlinePlus: a699040
- License data: US DailyMed: Oseltamivir
- Pregnancy category: AU: B1
- Routes of administration: By mouth
- Drug class: Neuraminidase inhibitor
- ATC code: J05AH02 (WHO)

Legal status
- Legal status: AU: S4 (Prescription only); UK: POM (Prescription only); US: ℞-only; EU: Rx-only

Pharmacokinetic data
- Bioavailability: >80%
- Protein binding: 42% (parent drug), 3% (active metabolite)
- Metabolism: Liver, to oseltamivir carboxylate
- Elimination half-life: 1–3 hours, 6–10 hours (active metabolite)
- Excretion: Urine (>90% as oseltamivir carboxylate), faeces

Identifiers
- IUPAC name: ethyl (3R,4R,5S)-4-acetamido-5-amino-3-(pentan-3-yloxy)-cyclohex-1-ene-1-carboxylate
- CAS Number: 196618-13-0 204255-11-8
- PubChem CID: 65028
- DrugBank: DB00198
- ChemSpider: 58540
- UNII: 20O93L6F9H
- KEGG: D08306; as salt: D00900
- ChEBI: CHEBI:7798
- ChEMBL: ChEMBL1229
- CompTox Dashboard (EPA): DTXSID9044291

Chemical and physical data
- Formula: C_{16}H_{28}N_{2}O_{4}
- Molar mass: 312.410 g·mol^{−1}
- 3D model (JSmol): Interactive image
- SMILES: CCC(CC)OC1C=C(CC(C1NC(=O)C)N)C(=O)OCC
- InChI: InChI=1S/C16H28N2O4/c1-5-12(6-2)22-14-9-11(16(20)21-7-3)8-13(17)15(14)18-10(4)19/h9,12-15H,5-8,17H2,1-4H3,(H,18,19)/t13-,14+,15+/m0/s1; Key:VSZGPKBBMSAYNT-RRFJBIMHSA-N

Oseltamivir, sold under the brand name Tamiflu among others, is an antiviral medication used to treat and prevent influenza A and influenza B, viruses that cause the flu. Many medical organizations recommend it in people who have complications or are at high risk of complications within 48 hours of first symptoms of infection. They recommend it to prevent infection in those at high risk, but not the general population. The Centers for Disease Control and Prevention (CDC) recommends that clinicians use their discretion to treat those at lower risk who present within 48 hours of first symptoms of infection. It is taken by mouth, either as a pill or liquid.

Recommendations regarding oseltamivir are controversial as are criticisms of the recommendations. A 2014 Cochrane Review concluded that oseltamivir does not reduce hospitalizations, and that there is no evidence of reduction in complications of influenza. Two meta-analyses have concluded that benefits in those who are otherwise healthy do not outweigh its risks. They also found little evidence regarding whether treatment changes the risk of hospitalization or death in high risk populations. However, another meta-analysis found that oseltamivir was effective for prevention of influenza at the individual and household levels.

Common side effects include vomiting, diarrhea, headache, and trouble sleeping. Other side effects may include psychiatric symptoms and seizures. In the United States, it is recommended for influenza infections during pregnancy. It has been taken by a small number of pregnant women without signs of problems. Dose adjustment may be needed in those with kidney problems.

Oseltamivir was approved for medical use in the US in 1999. It was the first neuraminidase inhibitor available by mouth. It is on the World Health Organization's List of Essential Medicines but was downgraded to "complementary" status in 2017. A generic version was approved in the US in 2016. In 2023, it was the 250th most commonly prescribed medication in the United States, with more than 1 million prescriptions.

== Medical uses ==
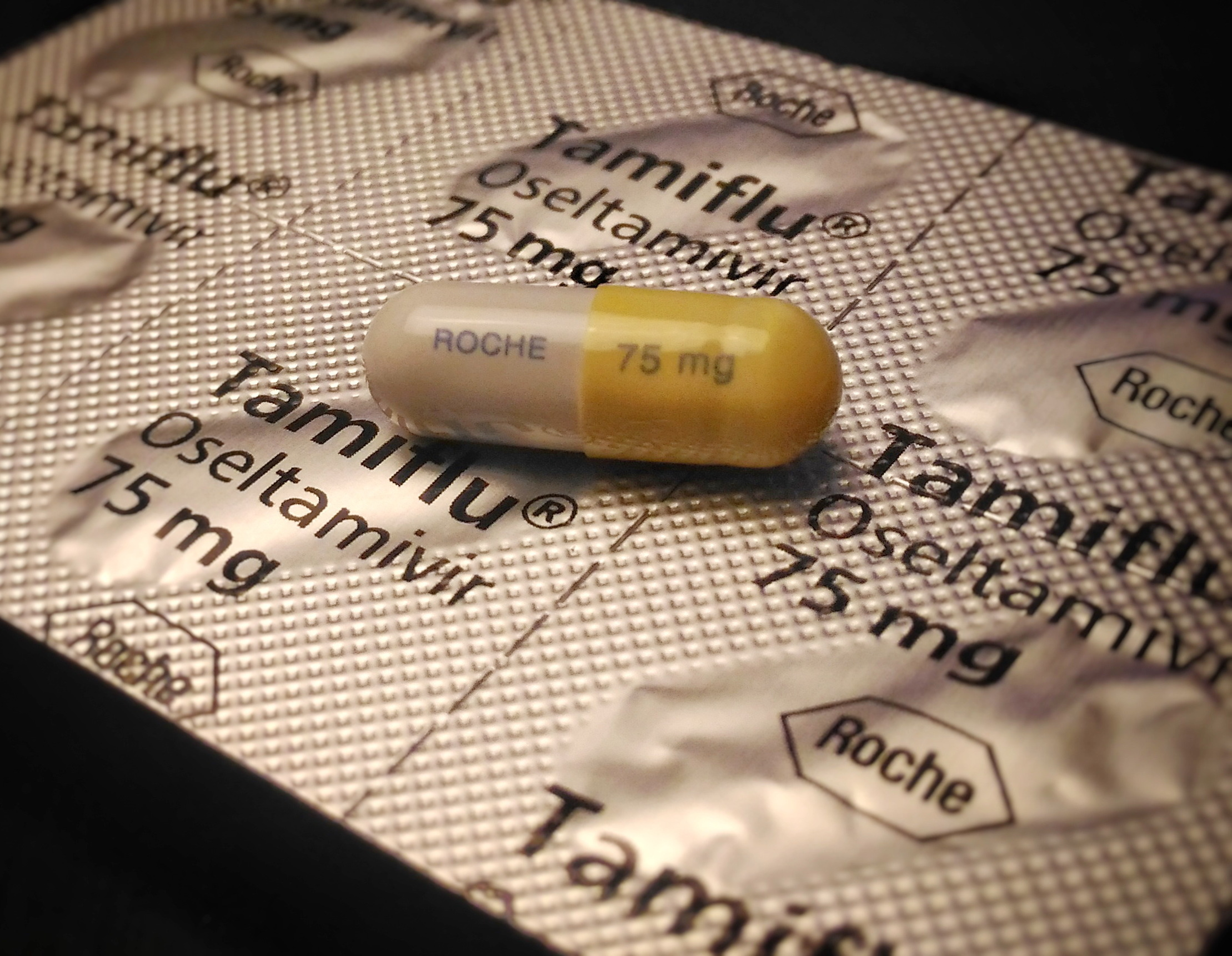
An oseltamivir capsule

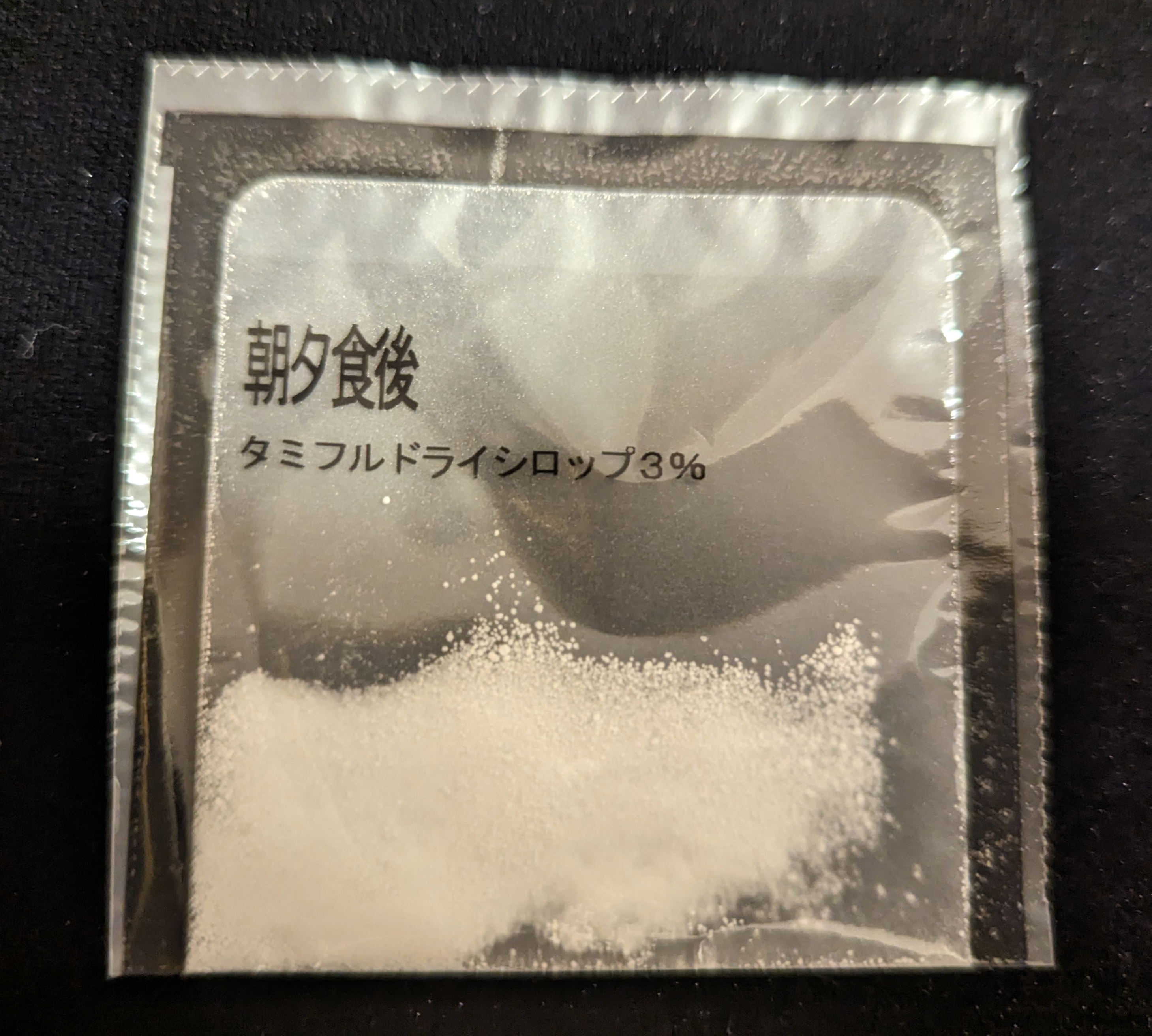
Oseltamivir dry syrup type

Oseltamivir is used for the prevention and treatment of influenza caused by influenza A and B viruses. It is on the World Health Organization's List of Essential Medicines. The World Health Organization (WHO) supports its use for severe illness due to confirmed or suspected influenza virus infection in critically ill people who have been hospitalized. Oseltamivir's risk-benefit ratio is controversial. In 2017, it was moved from the core to the complementary list based on its lower cost-effectiveness. The Expert Committee did not recommend the deletion of oseltamivir from the EML and EMLc, recognizing that it is the only medicine included on the Model Lists for critically ill patients with influenza and for influenza pandemic preparedness. However, the Committee noted that, since the inclusion of oseltamivir on the Model List in 2009, new evidence in seasonal and pandemic influenza has lowered earlier estimates of the magnitude of effect of oseltamivir on relevant clinical outcomes. The Committee recommended that the listing of oseltamivir be amended, moving the medicine from the core to the Complementary List, and that its use be restricted to severe illness due to confirmed or suspected influenza virus infection in critically ill hospitalized patients. The Expert Committee noted that WHO guidelines for pharmacological management of pandemic and seasonal influenza would be updated in 2017: unless new information is provided to support the use of oseltamivir in seasonal and pandemic outbreaks, the next Expert Committee might consider oseltamivir for deletion.

=== High-risk people ===
The US Centers for Disease Control and Prevention (CDC), European Centre for Disease Prevention and Control (ECDC), Public Health England, and the American Academy of Pediatrics (AAP) recommend the use of oseltamivir for people who have complications or are at high risk for complications. This includes those who are hospitalized, young children, those over the age of 65, people with other significant health problems, those who are pregnant, and Indigenous peoples of the Americas among others. The Infectious Disease Society of America takes the same position as the CDC.

A systematic review of systematic reviews did not find evidence for benefits in people who are at risk, noting that "the trials were not designed or powered to give results regarding serious complications, hospitalization and mortality", as did a 2014 Cochrane Review. The Cochrane Review further recommended: "On the basis of the findings of this review, clinicians and healthcare policy-makers should urgently revise current recommendations for use of the neuraminidase inhibitors (NIs) for individuals with influenza." That is not utilizing NIs for prevention or treatment "Based on these findings there appears to be no evidence for patients, clinicians or policy-makers to use these drugs to prevent serious outcomes, both in annual influenza and pandemic influenza outbreaks."

The CDC, ECDC, Public Health England, Infectious Disease Society of America, the AAP, and Roche (the originator) reject the conclusions of the Cochrane Review, arguing in part that the analysis inappropriately forms conclusions about outcomes in people who are seriously ill based on results obtained primarily in healthy populations, and that the analysis inappropriately included results from people not infected with influenza. The EMA did not change its labeling of the drug in response to the Cochrane study.

A 2014 review recommended that all people admitted to intensive care units during influenza outbreaks with a diagnosis of community-acquired pneumonia receive oseltamivir until the absence of influenza infection is established by polymerase chain reaction (PCR) testing.

A 2015 systematic review and meta-analysis found oseltamivir effective at treating the symptoms of influenza, reducing the length of hospitalization, and reducing the risk of otitis media. The same review found that oseltamivir did not significantly increase the risk of adverse events. A 2016 systematic review found that oseltamivir slightly reduced the time it takes for the symptoms of influenza to be alleviated, and that it also increased the risk of "nausea, vomiting, [and] psychiatric events in adults and vomiting in children." The decrease in duration of sickness was about 18 hours.

=== Otherwise healthy people ===
In those who are otherwise healthy the US Centers for Disease Control and Prevention states that antivirals may be considered within the first 48 hours. A German clinical practice guideline recommends against its use.

Two 2013 meta-analyses have concluded that benefits in those who are otherwise healthy do not outweigh its risks. When the analysis was restricted to people with confirmed infection, the same 2014 Cochrane Review (see above) found unclear evidence of change in the risk of complications such as pneumonia, while three other reviews found a decreased risk. Together, published studies suggest that oseltamivir reduces the duration of symptoms by 0.5–1.0 day. Any benefit of treatment must be balanced against side effects, which include psychiatric symptoms and increased rates of vomiting.

The 2014 Cochrane Collaboration review concluded that oseltamivir did not affect the need for hospitalizations, and that there is no proof of reduction of complications of influenza (such as pneumonia) because of a lack of diagnostic definitions, or reduction of the spread of the virus. There was also evidence that suggested that oseltamivir prevented some people from producing sufficient numbers of their own antibodies to fight infection. The authors recommended that guidance should be revised to take account of the evidence of small benefit and increased risk of harms.

The US Centers for Disease Control and Prevention (CDC), the European Centre for Disease Prevention and Control (ECDC), the Public Health England (PHE), the Infectious Disease Society of America (IDSA), the American Academy of Pediatrics (AAP), and Roche (the originator) rejected the recommendations of the 2014 Cochrane Review to urgently change treatment guidelines and drug labels.

=== Prevention ===
As of 2017, the US Centers for Disease Control and Prevention does not recommend to use oseltamivir generally for prevention due to concerns that widespread use will encourage resistance development. They recommend that it be considered in those at high risk, who have been exposed to influenza within 48 hours and have not received or only recently been vaccinated. They recommended it during outbreaks in long term care facilities and in those who are significantly immunosuppressed.

As of 2011, reviews concluded that when oseltamivir is used preventatively it decreases the risk of exposed people developing symptomatic disease. A systematic review of systematic reviews found low to moderate evidence that it decreases the risk of getting symptomatic influenza by 1 to 12% (a relative decrease of 64 to 92%). It recommended against its use in healthy, low-risk persons due to cost, the risk of resistance development, and side effects and concluded it might be useful for prevention in unvaccinated high risk persons.

== Side effects ==
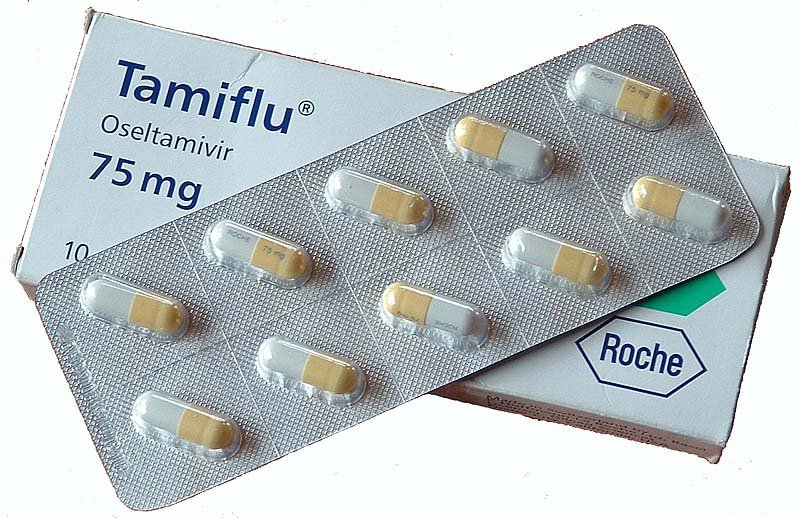
A package of capsules

According to the FDA, the two most common adverse drug reactions associated with oseltamivir therapy are nausea (10% vs 6% placebo) and vomiting (9% vs 3% placebo). Oseltamivir's effect on the heart is unclear: it may reduce cardiac symptoms, but may also induce serious arrhythmias.

Postmarketing reports include liver inflammation and elevated liver enzymes, rash, allergic reactions including anaphylaxis, toxic epidermal necrolysis, abnormal heart rhythms, seizure, confusion, aggravation of diabetes, and haemorrhagic colitis and Stevens–Johnson syndrome. Neuropsychiatric symptoms and body pain, followed by skin problems, were identified as the side effects most significantly reducing patient satisfaction on a drug review platform.

The US and EU package inserts for oseltamivir contain a warning of psychiatric effects observed in post-marketing surveillance. The frequency of these appears to be low and a causative role for oseltamivir has not been established. The 2014 Cochrane Review found a dose-response effect on psychiatric events. In trials of prevention in adults one person was harmed for every 94 treated. Neither of the two most cited published treatment trials of oseltamivir reported any drug-attributable serious adverse events. Subsequent studies found that neuropsychiatric and psychiatric adverse events are associated with influenza itself rather than oseltamivir treatment. Oseltamivir treatment is associated with a reduced risk of neuropsychiatric events and oseltamivir prophylaxis is not associated with an increased risk of neuropsychiatric events compared to individuals without influenza infection.

It is pregnancy category B in Australia, meaning that it has been taken by a small number of women without signs of problems and in animal studies it looks safe. Dose adjustment may be needed in those with kidney problems.

== Pharmacology ==
=== Mechanism of action ===
Oseltamivir is a neuraminidase inhibitor, a competitive inhibitor of influenza's neuraminidase enzyme. The neuraminidase enzyme binds to the sialic acid which is found on glycoproteins on the surface of human cells. Then it cleaves the sialic acid, which helps new virions to exit the cell. As Oseltamivir is an analogue of the sialic acid, the enzyme can bind to Oseltamivir instead, in which case the enzyme will not bind to sialic acid, so it will not cleave it and new virions will not exit the cell.

=== Pharmacokinetics ===
Its oral bioavailability is over 80% and is extensively metabolised to its active form upon first-pass through the liver, via esterases. It does not interact with cytochrome P450 enzymes in the liver. It has a volume of distribution of 23–26 litres. Its half-life is about 1–3 hours and its active carboxylate metabolite has a half-life of 6–10 hours. More than 90% of the oral dose is eliminated in the urine as the active metabolite.

== Resistance ==
The vast majority of mutations conferring resistance are single amino acid residue substitutions (His274Tyr in N1) in the neuraminidase enzyme. A 2011 meta-analysis of 15 studies found a pooled incidence rate for oseltamivir resistance of 2.6%. Subgroup analyses detected higher rates among influenza A patients, especially the H1N1 subtype. It was found that a substantial number of patients might become oseltamivir-resistant as a result of oseltamivir use, and that oseltamivir resistance might be significantly associated with pneumonia. In severely immunocompromised patients there were reports of prolonged shedding of oseltamivir- (or zanamivir)-resistant virus, even after oseltamivir treatment was stopped.

=== H1N1 flu or "swine flu" ===
As of December 15, 2010, the World Health Organization (WHO) reported 314 samples of the prevalent 2009 pandemic H1N1 flu tested worldwide showed resistance to oseltamivir.

The US Centers for Disease Control and Prevention (CDC) found sporadic oseltamivir-resistant 2009 H1N1 virus infections had been identified, including with rare episodes of limited transmission, but the public health impact had been limited. Those sporadic cases of resistance were found in immunosuppressed patients during oseltamivir treatment and persons who developed illness while receiving oseltamivir chemoprophylaxis.

During 2011, a new influenza A(H1N1)2009 variant with mildly reduced oseltamivir (and zanamivir) sensitivity was detected in more than 10% of community specimens in Singapore and more than 30% of samples from northern Australia.

While there is concern that antiviral resistance may develop in people with haematologic malignancies due to their inability to reduce viral loads and several surveillance studies found oseltamivir-resistant pH1N1 after administration of oseltamivir in those people, as of November 2013, widespread transmission of oseltamivir-resistant pH1N1 has not occurred.

During the 2007–08 flu season, the US CDC found 10.9% of H1N1 samples (n=1,020) to be resistant. In the 2008–09 season, the proportion of resistant H1N1 increased to 99.4%, while no other seasonal strains (H3N2, B) showed resistance.

=== Seasonal flu ===
From 2009 to 2014, oseltamivir resistance was very low in seasonal flu. In the 2010–11 flu season, 99.1% of H1N1, 99.8% of H3N2, and 100% of Influenza B remained oseltamivir susceptible in the US. In January 2012, the US and European CDCs reported all seasonal flu samples tested since October 2011 to be oseltamivir susceptible. In the 2013–14 season only 1% of 2009 H1N1 viruses showed oseltamivir resistance. No other influenza viruses were resistant to oseltamivir.

=== H3N2 ===
Three studies have found resistance in 0%, 3.3%, and 18% of subjects. In the study with the 18% resistance rate, the subjects were children, many of whom had not been previously exposed to influenza virus and therefore had a weakened immune response; the results suggest that higher and earlier dosing may be necessary in such populations.

=== Influenza B ===
In 2007, Japanese investigators detected neuraminidase-resistant influenza B virus strains in individuals not treated with these drugs. The prevalence was 1.7%. According to the US Centers for Disease Control and Prevention (CDC), As of 2019, transmission of oseltamivir-resistant influenza B virus strains—from persons treated with the drug—is rare.

=== H5N1 avian influenza "bird flu" ===
As of 2013, H274Y and N294S mutations that confer resistance to oseltamivir have been identified in a few H5N1 isolates from infected patients treated with oseltamivir, and have emerged spontaneously in Egypt.

=== H7N9 avian influenza ===
As of 2013, two of 14 adults infected with A(H7N9) and treated with oseltamivir developed oseltamivir-resistant virus with the Arg292Lys mutation.

== History ==
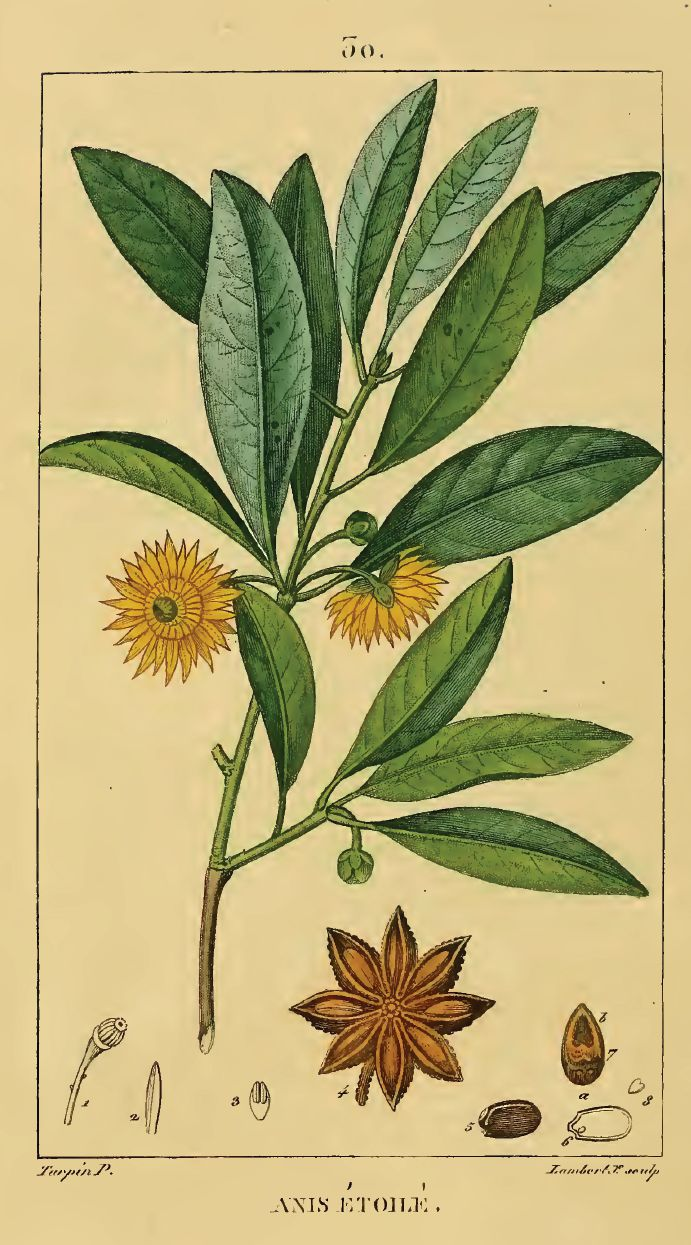
Plate from François-Pierre Chaumeton's 1833 Flore Médicale

Oseltamivir was discovered by scientists at Gilead Sciences using shikimic acid as a starting point for synthesis; shikimic acid was originally available only as an extract of Chinese star anise; but by 2006, 30% of the supply was manufactured recombinantly in E. coli. Gilead exclusively licensed their relevant patents to Roche in 1996. The drug has not been patent-protected in Thailand, the Philippines, Indonesia, and several other countries.

In 1999, the FDA approved oseltamivir phosphate for the treatment of influenza in adults based on two double-blind, randomized, placebo-controlled clinical trials. In June 2002, the European Medicines Agency (EMA) approved oseltamivir phosphate for prophylaxis and treatment of influenza. In 2003, a pooled analysis of ten randomised clinical trials concluded that oseltamivir reduced the risk of lower respiratory tract infections resulting in antibiotic use and hospital admissions in adults.

Oseltamivir (as Tamiflu) was widely used during the H5N1 avian influenza epidemic in Southeast Asia in 2005. In response to the epidemic, various governments – including those of the United Kingdom, Canada, Israel, United States, and Australia – stockpiled quantities of oseltamivir in preparation for a possible pandemic and there were worldwide shortages of the drug, driven by the high demand for stockpiling. In November 2005, US President George W. Bush requested that Congress fund US$1 billion for the production and stockpile of oseltamivir, after Congress had already approved $1.8 billion for military use of the drug. Defense Secretary Donald Rumsfeld, who was a past chairman of Gilead Sciences, recused himself from all government decisions regarding the drug.

In 2006, a Cochrane Review (since withdrawn) raised controversy by concluding that oseltamivir should not be used during routine seasonal influenza because of its low effectiveness.

In December 2008, the Indian drug company Cipla won a case in India's court system allowing it to manufacture a cheaper generic version of Tamiflu, called Antiflu. In May 2009, Cipla won approval from the World Health Organization (WHO) certifying that its drug Antiflu was as effective as Tamiflu, and Antiflu is included in the WHO list of prequalified medicinal products.

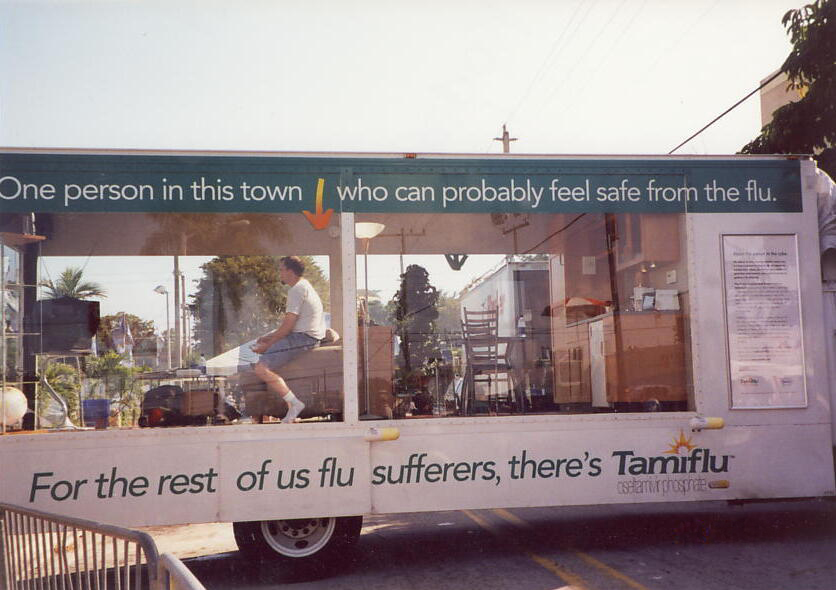
Marketing display used at festivals features a person living in a hermetically sealed environment.

In 2009, a new A/H1N1 influenza virus was discovered to be spreading in North America. In June 2009, the WHO declared the A/H1N1 influenza a pandemic. The National Institute for Health and Care Excellence (NICE), the US Centers for Disease Control and Prevention (CDC), the WHO, and the European Centre for Disease Prevention and Control (ECDC) maintained their recommendation to use oseltamivir.

From 2010 to 2012, Cochrane requested Roche's full clinical study reports of their trials, which they did not provide. In 2011, a freedom of information request to the European Medicines Agency (EMA) provided Cochrane with reports from 16 Roche oseltamivir trials. In 2012, the Cochrane team published an interim review based on those reports. In 2013, Roche released 74 full clinical study reports of oseltamivir trials after GSK released the data on zanamivir studies. In 2014, Cochrane published an updated review based solely on full clinical study reports and regulatory documents. In 2016, Roche's oseltamivir patents began to expire.

== Veterinary use ==
In 2010 it was reported that oseltamivir reduced disease severity and hospitalization time in canine parvovirus infection. The drug may limit the ability of the virus to invade the crypt cells of the small intestine and decrease gastrointestinal bacterial colonization and toxin production.

== Research ==
Oseltamivir has been deemed ineffective at treating COVID-19, consistent with the SARS-CoV-2 virus lacking influenza's neuraminidase enzyme.
