= CPSF7 =

Protein-coding gene in humans

Identifiers
- Aliases: CPSF7, CFIm59, FLJ12529, cleavage and polyadenylation specific factor 7
- External IDs: MGI: 1917826; GeneCards: CPSF7
Available structures
PDB	Ortholog search: PDBe RCSB
PDB	List of PDB id codes 3N9U

Gene location (Human)
Chr.	Chromosome 11 (human)
Band	11q12.2	Start	61,402,641 bp
Band	11q12.2	End	61,430,031 bp

Gene location (Mouse)
Chr.	Chromosome 19 (mouse)
Band	19|19 A	Start	10,502,630 bp
Band	19|19 A	End	10,525,017 bp
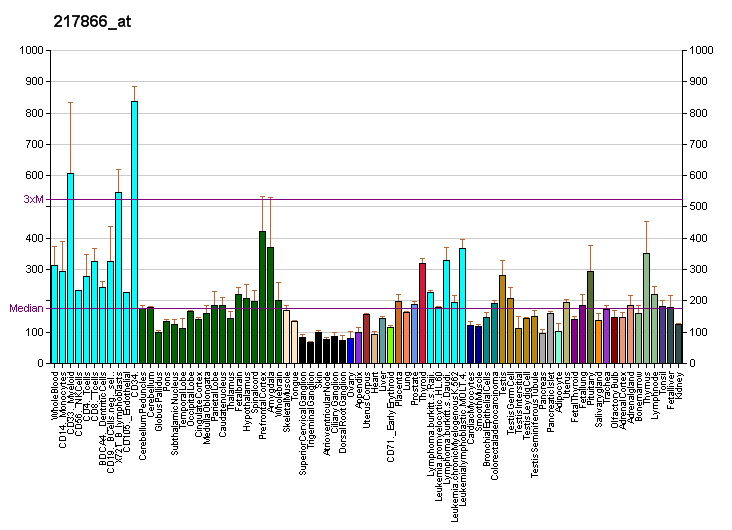
RNA expression pattern
Bgee	Human / Mouse (ortholog); Top expressed in: anterior pituitary; right uterine tube; right lobe of thyroid gland; left lobe of thyroid gland; body of uterus; left ovary; canal of the cervix; right ovary; ventricular zone; gastric mucosa / Top expressed in: neural layer of retina; mesenteric lymph nodes; ventricular zone; thymus; superior surface of tongue; genital tubercle; median eminence; paraventricular nucleus of hypothalamus; maxillary prominence; mandibular prominence; More reference expression data
BioGPS	More reference expression data
Gene ontology
Molecular function	protein binding; nucleic acid binding; RNA binding
Cellular component	membrane; nucleus; nucleoplasm; mRNA cleavage factor complex; cytoplasm; mRNA cleavage and polyadenylation specificity factor complex
Biological process	mRNA splicing, via spliceosome; termination of RNA polymerase II transcription; mRNA processing; mRNA 3'-end processing; protein tetramerization; protein heterotetramerization; pre-mRNA cleavage required for polyadenylation; mRNA alternative polyadenylation; messenger ribonucleoprotein complex assembly
Sources:Amigo / QuickGO
Orthologs
Databases	NCBI: entry; OMA: entry
Species	Human	Mouse
Entrez	79869	269061
Ensembl	ENSG00000149532	ENSMUSG00000034820
UniProt	Q8N684	Q8BTV2
RefSeq (mRNA)	NM_001136040; NM_001142565; NM_024811	NM_001164272; NM_172302; NM_001362450
RefSeq (protein)	NP_001129512; NP_001136037; NP_079087	NP_001157744; NP_758506; NP_001349379
Location (UCSC)	Chr 11: 61.4 – 61.43 Mb	Chr 19: 10.5 – 10.53 Mb
PubMed search
- Wikidata
View/Edit Human	View/Edit Mouse

Cleavage and polyadenylation specificity factor subunit 7 is a protein that in humans is encoded by the CPSF7 gene.

== Function ==
CPSF7, also known as CFIm59, is the cleavage factor of two closely associated protein complexes in the 3' untranslated region of a newly synthesized pre-messenger RNA (mRNA) molecule used in gene transcription. CPSF7 is one of three Cleavage and polyadenylation specificity factors (CPSF), the other two being CFIm25 (or CPSF5/NUDT21) and CFIm68 (or CPSF6).
