= Antileukoproteinase =

Protein found in humans

SLPI

Identifiers
- Aliases: SLPI, ALK1, ALP, BLPI, HUSI, HUSI-I, MPI, WAP4, WFDC4, secretory leukocyte peptidase inhibitor
- External IDs: OMIM: 107285; MGI: 109297; GeneCards: SLPI
Available structures
PDB	Ortholog search: PDBe RCSB
PDB	List of PDB id codes 2Z7F, 4DOQ

Gene location (Human)
Chr.	Chromosome 20 (human)
Band	20q13.12	Start	45,252,239 bp
Band	20q13.12	End	45,254,564 bp

Gene location (Mouse)
Chr.	Chromosome 2 (mouse)
Band	2|2 H3	Start	164,195,990 bp
Band	2|2 H3	End	164,231,015 bp
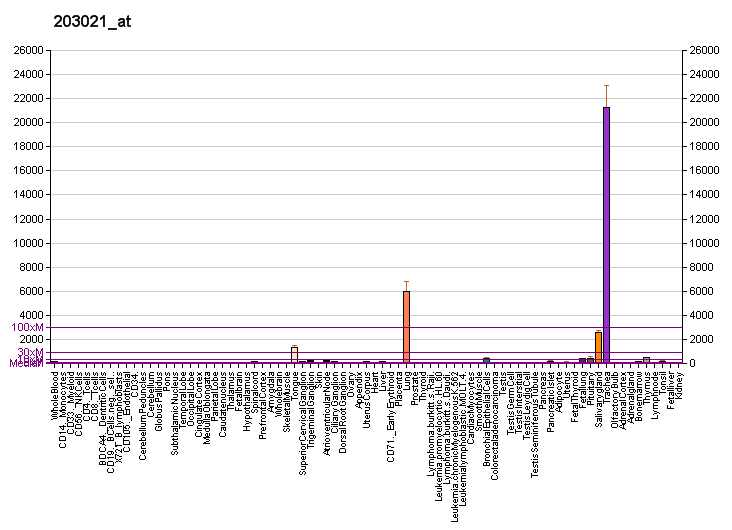
RNA expression pattern
Bgee	Human / Mouse (ortholog); Top expressed in: trachea; bronchus; epithelium of bronchus; bronchial epithelial cell; olfactory zone of nasal mucosa; nasal epithelium; minor salivary glands; palpebral conjunctiva; mucosa of paranasal sinus; parotid gland / Top expressed in: esophagus; superior surface of tongue; granulocyte; submandibular gland; decidua; tibiofemoral joint; mesenteric lymph nodes; spleen; blood; pyloric antrum; More reference expression data
BioGPS	More reference expression data
Gene ontology
Molecular function	peptidase inhibitor activity; enzyme binding; protein binding; serine-type endopeptidase inhibitor activity; DNA binding; mRNA binding; endopeptidase inhibitor activity
Cellular component	extracellular matrix; extracellular exosome; extracellular region; extracellular space; Golgi apparatus; specific granule lumen; collagen-containing extracellular matrix
Biological process	antibacterial humoral response; response to lipopolysaccharide; negative regulation of viral genome replication; negative regulation of peptidase activity; innate immune response; negative regulation of protein binding; defense response to bacterium; immune response; negative regulation of endopeptidase activity; immune system process; neutrophil degranulation
Sources:Amigo / QuickGO
Orthologs
Databases	NCBI: entry; OMA: entry
Species	Human	Mouse
Entrez	6590	20568
Ensembl	ENSG00000124107	ENSMUSG00000017002
UniProt	P03973	P97430
RefSeq (mRNA)	NM_003064	NM_011414
RefSeq (protein)	NP_003055	NP_035544
Location (UCSC)	Chr 20: 45.25 – 45.25 Mb	Chr 2: 164.2 – 164.23 Mb
PubMed search
- Wikidata
View/Edit Human	View/Edit Mouse

Antileukoproteinase, also known as secretory leukocyte protease inhibitor (SLPI), is an enzyme that in humans is encoded by the SLPI gene. SLPI is a highly cationic single-chain protein with eight intramolecular disulfide bonds. It is found in large quantities in bronchial, cervical, and nasal mucosa, saliva, and seminal fluids. SLPI inhibits human leukocyte elastase, human cathepsin G, human trypsin, neutrophil elastase, and mast cell chymase. X-ray crystallography has shown that SLPI has two homologous domains of 53 and 54 amino acids, one of which exhibits anti-protease activity (C-terminal domain). The other domain (N-terminal domain) is not known to have any function.

== Function ==
This gene encodes a secreted inhibitor which protects epithelial tissues from serine proteases. It is found in various secretions including seminal plasma, cervical mucus, and bronchial secretions, and has affinity for trypsin, leukocyte elastase, and cathepsin G. Its inhibitory effect contributes to the immune response by protecting epithelial surfaces from attack by endogenous proteolytic enzymes; the protein is also thought to have broad-spectrum antibiotic activity.

== Clinical significance ==
The gene for SLPI is expressed by cells at many mucosal surfaces located in the tissues of the lungs, cervix, seminal vesicles, and parotid ducts. SLPI is also one of the dominantly present proteins in nasal epithelial lining fluid and other nasal secretions. Tissue SLPI expression reveals a clear compartmentalization, being highest in the endocervix and lowest in the endometrium of postmenopausal women. Hormonal treatment differentially modulates tissue SLPI expression along the reproductive tract. Many diseases, such as emphysema, cystic fibrosis, and idiopathic pulmonary fibrosis, are characterized by increased levels of neutrophil elastase. SLPI is one of the major defenses against the destruction of pulmonary tissues and epithelial tissues by neutrophil elastase. SLPI is considered to be the predominant elastase inhibitor in secretions, while α1-antitrypsin is the predominant elastase inhibitor in tissues. Several diseases, including those listed, are actually the result of SLPI and α1-antitrypsin defenses being overwhelmed by neutrophil elastase. It has been suggested that recombinant human SLPI be administered to treat symptoms of cystic fibrosis, genetic emphysema, and asthma. In addition, SLPI has occasionally been monitored in an effort to coordinate its levels with different pathological conditions. Increased levels of SLPI in nasal secretions and bronchoalveolar fluids may be denotive of inflammatory lung conditions or allergic reactions, and increased levels of SLPI in plasma may be indicative of pneumonia.

Increased levels of SLPI in saliva and plasma may also be an indicator of HIV infection. This is evident due to the virtual nonexistence of HIV transmission through oral-to-oral contact. This antiviral activity is due to the interference of SLPI in events that are mediated by protease, such as entry into the host cell and replication of viral genetic material. Studies have shown that decreasing levels of SLPI in saliva also decreases its anti-HIV activity. What makes SLPI such a topic of interest is that it exhibits anti-HIV properties in physiological conditions, rather than artificial ones.

Furthermore, it has been shown that there is an inverse correlation between the levels of SLPI and high-risk Human Papillomavirus (HPV) infection, demonstrating that high levels of SLPI confer protection against HPV infection.

== Interactions ==
SLPI has been shown to interact with PLSCR1 and PLSCR4 on the plasma membrane of T-cells, specifically in the proximity of CD4. This interaction is hypothesized to be one of the ways SLPI inhibits HIV infection.

Additionally, it has been shown that SLPI is able to bind the Annexin A2/S100A10 heterotetramer (A2t), a co-factor HIV infection, on the surface of macrophages. This interaction with A2t has also been shown to block HPV uptake and infection of epithelial cells.
