= TMEM267 =

Protein

Identifiers
- Aliases: TMEM267, C5orf28, transmembrane protein 267
- External IDs: MGI: 3648543; HomoloGene: 49708; GeneCards: TMEM267; OMA:TMEM267 - orthologs

Gene location (Human)
Chr.	Chromosome 5 (human)
Band	5p12	Start	43,444,252 bp
Band	5p12	End	43,483,893 bp

Gene location (Mouse)
Chr.	Chromosome 13 (mouse)
Band	13|13 D2.3	Start	119,624,575 bp
Band	13|13 D2.3	End	120,072,595 bp
RNA expression pattern
Bgee	Human / Mouse (ortholog); Top expressed in: islet of Langerhans; thyroid gland; left lobe of thyroid gland; gonad; right lobe of thyroid gland; Epithelium of choroid plexus; stromal cell of endometrium; rectum; Achilles tendon; tibial arteries / Top expressed in: spermatid; spermatocyte; seminiferous tubule; muscle of thigh; triceps brachii muscle; primary oocyte; medial ganglionic eminence; subdivision of hippocampus; Region I of hippocampus proper; intercostal muscle; More reference expression data
BioGPS	n/a
Orthologs
Species	Human	Mouse
Entrez	64417	633640
Ensembl	ENSG00000151881	ENSMUSG00000074634
UniProt	Q0VDI3	Q8VDR5
RefSeq (mRNA)	NM_022483	NM_001039244; NM_001177666; NM_001370626; NM_001370627
RefSeq (protein)	NP_071928; NP_001364323; NP_001364324; NP_001364325; NP_001364326 NP_001364327; NP_001364328; NP_001364329; NP_001364330; NP_001364331; NP_001364332	NP_001034333; NP_001171137; NP_001357555; NP_001357556
Location (UCSC)	Chr 5: 43.44 – 43.48 Mb	Chr 13: 119.62 – 120.07 Mb
PubMed search
- Wikidata
View/Edit Human	View/Edit Mouse

TMEM267 is a protein that in humans is encoded by the TMEM267 gene. It is a possible oncogene which encodes a transmembrane protein. The function of TMEM267 most likely involves transportation of molecules from the cytosol, as the presence of motifs and domains involved in transportation were conserved in orthologs. TMEM267 has orthologs in many species and is expressed at highest levels in the thyroid.

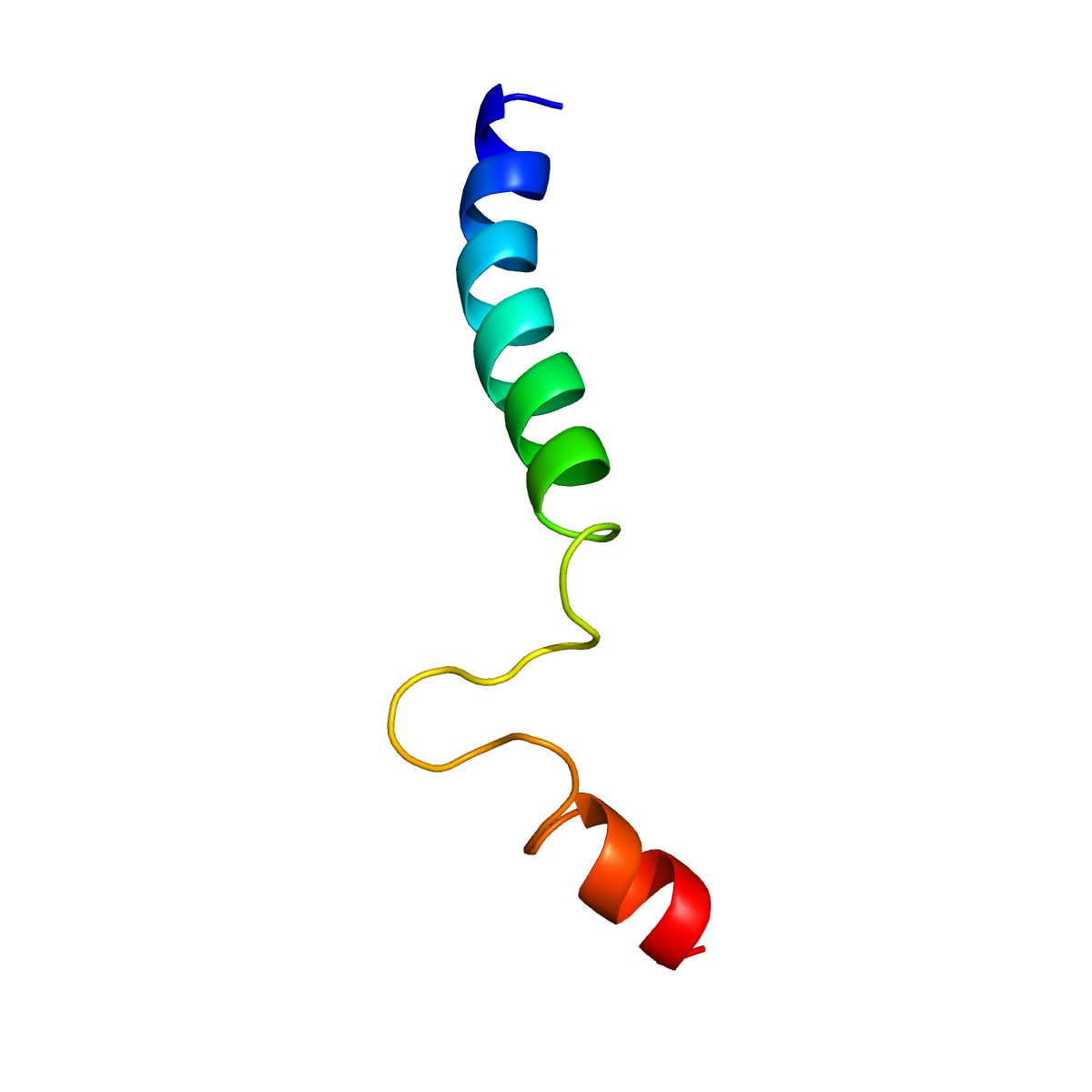
PHYRE Tertiary Structure prediction for TMEM267

== Gene ==
Known aliases for TMEM267include C5orf28, B2RDA6, and Q9H6Z2. TMEM267 is found on chromosome 5, cytoband p12 on the reverse strand between base pairs 43,444,252 and 43,485,178, meaning it has length of 40,927 base pairs. TMEM267 produces 13 distinct gt-ag introns and 12 different mRNAs, with 9 alternatively spliced variants and 3 unspliced forms. It has 2 alternative promoters and 7 validated polyadenylation sites. There are 6 predicted promoters of varying lengths.

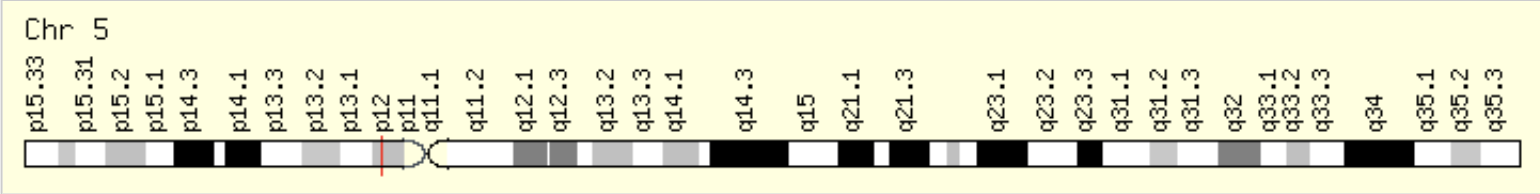
TMEM267 location on chromosome 5 in humans from GeneCards.

Name	Accession number	Number of Exons	Size (bp)
Transcript Variant 1	NM_022483	3	2736
Transcript Variant 2	NM_001377394.1	4	2887
Transcript Variant X2	XM_011514075	4	3574
Transcript Variant 3	NM_001377395.1	5	3210
Transcript Variant 4	NM_001377396.1	3	2960
Transcript Variant 5	NM_001377397.1	4	3108
Transcript Variant 6	NM_001377398.1	5	3283
Transcript Variant 7	NM_001377399.1	3	3377
Transcript Variant 8	NM_001377400.1	4	3528
Transcript Variant 9	NM_001377401.1	4	2834
Transcript Variant 10	NM_001377402.1	3	2809
Transcript Variant 11	NM_001377403.1	5	2979

== Protein ==
=== General information ===
The TMEM267 protein in all isoforms is 215 amino acids in length. All of the isoforms have a predicted molecular mass of 24.2 kDa and theoretical isoelectric point of 8.91. There was an above average percentage of histidine and tryptophan residues. The percentage of asparagine, glutamic acid and tyrosine were below average. After analysis of Antarctic Yellowbelly Rockcod, Tropical clawed frog, Willow flycatcher, Common wall lizard, and pacific white-sided dolphin orthologs, above average percent composition of tryptophan and below average percent composition of asparagine and glutamic acid residues was conserved across amphibians, fish, mammals, birds, and reptiles.

=== Isoforms ===
Name	Accession number	Size (aa)
Transcript Variant 2	NP_001364323.1	215
Transcript Variant X2	XM_011514075	215
Transcript Variant 3	NP_001364324	215
Transcript Variant 4	NP_001364325	215
Transcript Variant 5	NP_001364326	215
Transcript Variant 6	NP_001364327	215
Transcript Variant 7	NP_001364328	215
Transcript Variant 8	NP_001364329	215
Transcript Variant 9	NP_001364330	215
Transcript Variant 10	NP_001364331	215
Transcript Variant 11	NP_001364332	215
Transcript Variant 12	NP_071928	215

=== Transmembrane regions ===
The predictions surrounding the transmembrane regions of TMEM267 are unclear. Some prediction tools claim there are no transmembrane or hydrophobic regions. Others predict between 2 and 5 transmembrane domains. The consensus is that there is most likely at least two transmembrane regions in the amino acids in the region around 113-135 and 176–198. The helical wheel diagrams of the three transmembrane regions given by NCBI Gene indicate the presence of polar amino acid which are basic and acidic in the transmembrane regions which is unusual.

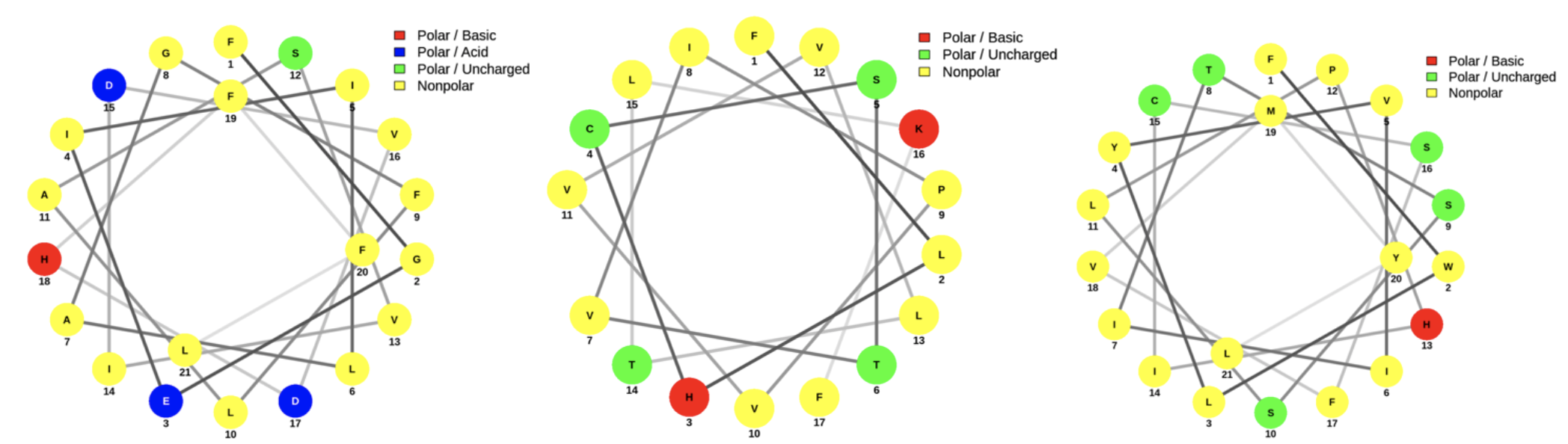
NetWheels Prediction for TMEM267 transmembrane regions

=== Domains ===
Two domains were predicted for TMEM267. First is a LaxA-binding, inner membrane-associated mutative hydrolase, which indicates that TMEM267 may be involved as a group of membrane-bound metal-dependent hydrolases that may act as phospholipases. The other is predicted to be a Vacuolar sorting protein 9 (VPS9) domain, which indicates that TMEM267 may be involved in trafficking of molecules to lysosomes and cell signaling.

Domain	Location	Conserved in Isoforms	Conserved in Orthologs
LaxA binding site	55-161	yes	yes
Vacuolar Sorting Protein 9 (VSP9) binding site	175-199	yes	no

=== Motifs ===
Motifs that were predicted are a canonical arginine-containing phosphopeptide motif, which may be involved in the transportation of the 14-3-3 proteins which are involved in many cellular processes. A binding site for Interferon Regulatory Factor 3 (IRF-3) protein may be involved in the signaling pathway which actives IRF-3 in the presence of viral and microbial infections. Tryptophan-based motifs which enable targeting of tethering to a homology domain could mean that TMEM267 may play a role in mediating transportation form the Golgi to the ER. The coatomer subunit delta (delta-COP) is a cytosolic protein complex that binds to motifs and associates with vesicles involved in protein transport from the ER and Golgi. An LC3-Interacting Region (LIR) motif was predicted, which indicates that TMEM267 may be involved in the autophagy pathway, which is involved in transferring of cytoplasmic material in autophagosomes to lysosomes as well as removal of toxic macromolecules and organelles to maintain the health of the cell. The Class 2 PDZ-binding motif predicts that TMEM267 could be involved with PDZ proteins, which are influential in trafficking, recycling, and intracellular sorting. The Wxxx[FY] motif indicates that TMEM267 could be involved in the interaction of Pex14 with Pex5 proteins.

Motif	Location	Conserved in Isoforms	Conserved in Orthologs	Cellular Location
Canonical arginine-containing phosphopeptide motif	49-56	Yes	Yes	cytosol
Interferon Regulatory Factor 3 (IRF-3) binding site	139-146	Yes	Yes	cytosol
Tryptophan-based motifs that enable tethering to a homology domain	144-151	Yes	Yes	cytosol
LIR motif	64-68	Yes	Yes	cytosol
PDZ-binding motif	210-215	Yes	Yes	cytosol
Wxxx[FY] motif	166-170	Yes	Yes	cytosol

=== Localization and abundance ===
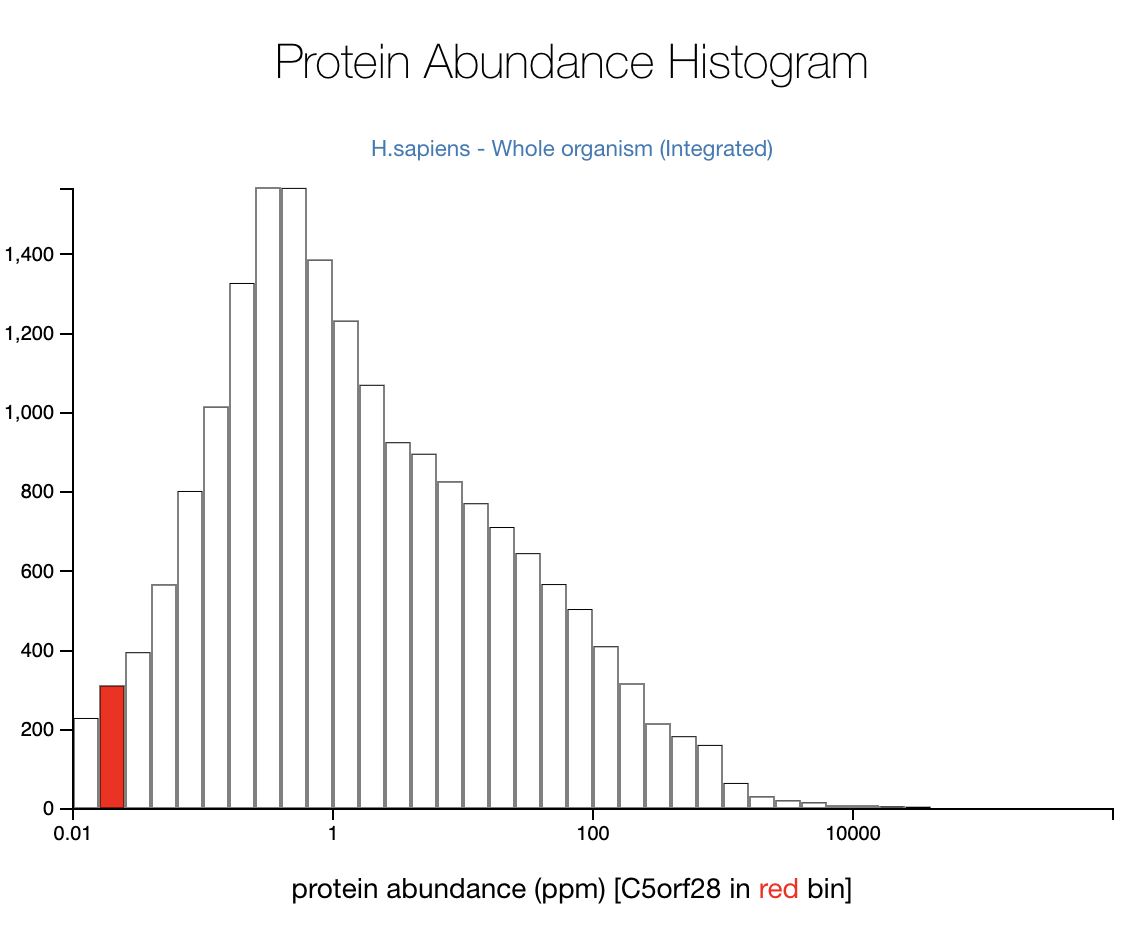
TMEM267 protein abundance in the human body from PAXdb

Overall, TMEM267 is most likely found in the cytoplasm. The TMEM267 protein was claimed to be localized in the nucleoplasm of cells. Another tool predicted it to be found in the cytoplasm (69.6%) and mitochondrial (13%) with reliability 94.1 from Reinhardt's method for Cytoplasmic/Nuclear discrimination. TMEM267 is not abundant in the human body at 0.05 ppm.

=== Secondary structure predictions ===
Secondary structure predictions were done using the transmembrane regions for TMEM267 given by NCBI Gene. The prediction servers indicate that amino acids 1-76 are helical in nature. The extracellular and intracellular regions of the TMEM267 protein are predicted to be a combination of alpha helices and beta sheets, but there is not a consensus.

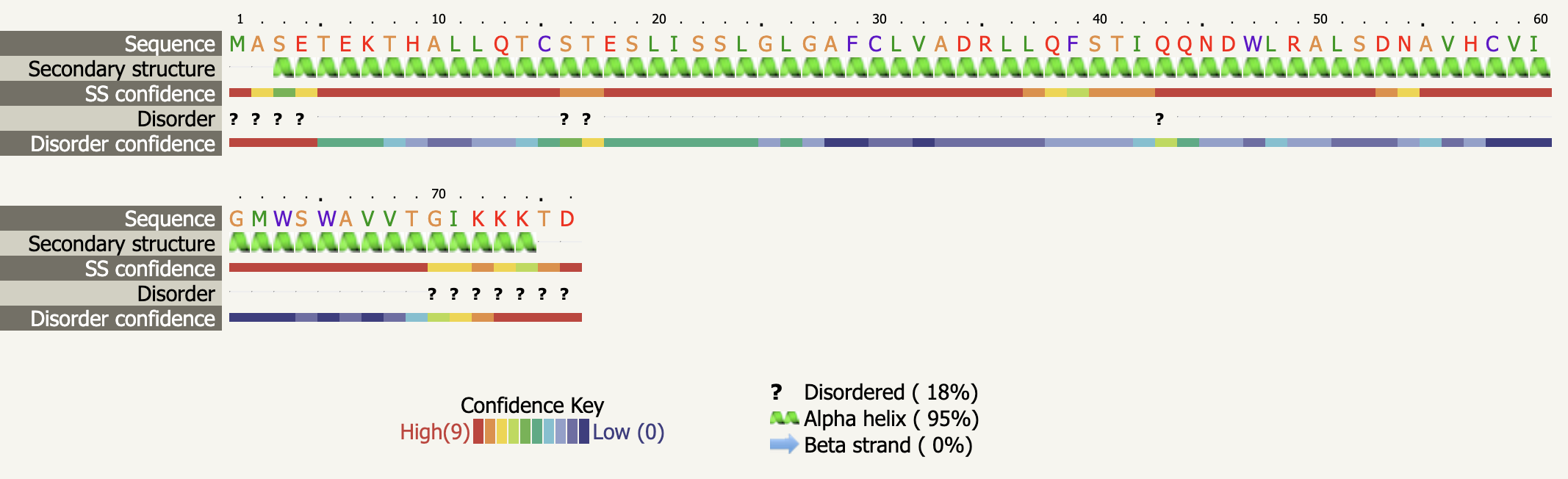
PHYRE2 prediction of secondary and tertiary structure for TMEM267

=== Post-translational modifications ===
There is no evidence of post-translational modifications of the TMEM267 protein found in tissues. According to protein sequence analysis, there is a prediction of one palmitoylation site, a SUMO Interaction and two sumoylation sites. There are many predicted phosphorylation sites in the non-transmembrane regions with various protein kinases including AGC, CKII, and Case kinase II. One site is predicted to be acetylated in the N-terminus of TMEM267. TMEM267 has four predicted glycation sites, as well as seven O-beta-GlycNAc sites.

== Expression ==
TMEM267 protein is expressed in over 100 tissues in the body, meaning it has low tissue specificity, but is largely present in the thyroid, pituitary gland, and pancreas. Data from NCBI Geo shows that there are higher levels of expression in mainly the thyroid but other tissues have varied expression for each sample. There seems to be, on average, highest expression levels in thyroid, ovaries, testes, pituitary gland, and pancreas. TMEM267 is not expressed at a very high level compared to Beta Actin, which has almost triple the RPKM compared to TMEM267. TMEM267 is expressed at 1.6 times the average gene on chromosome 5.

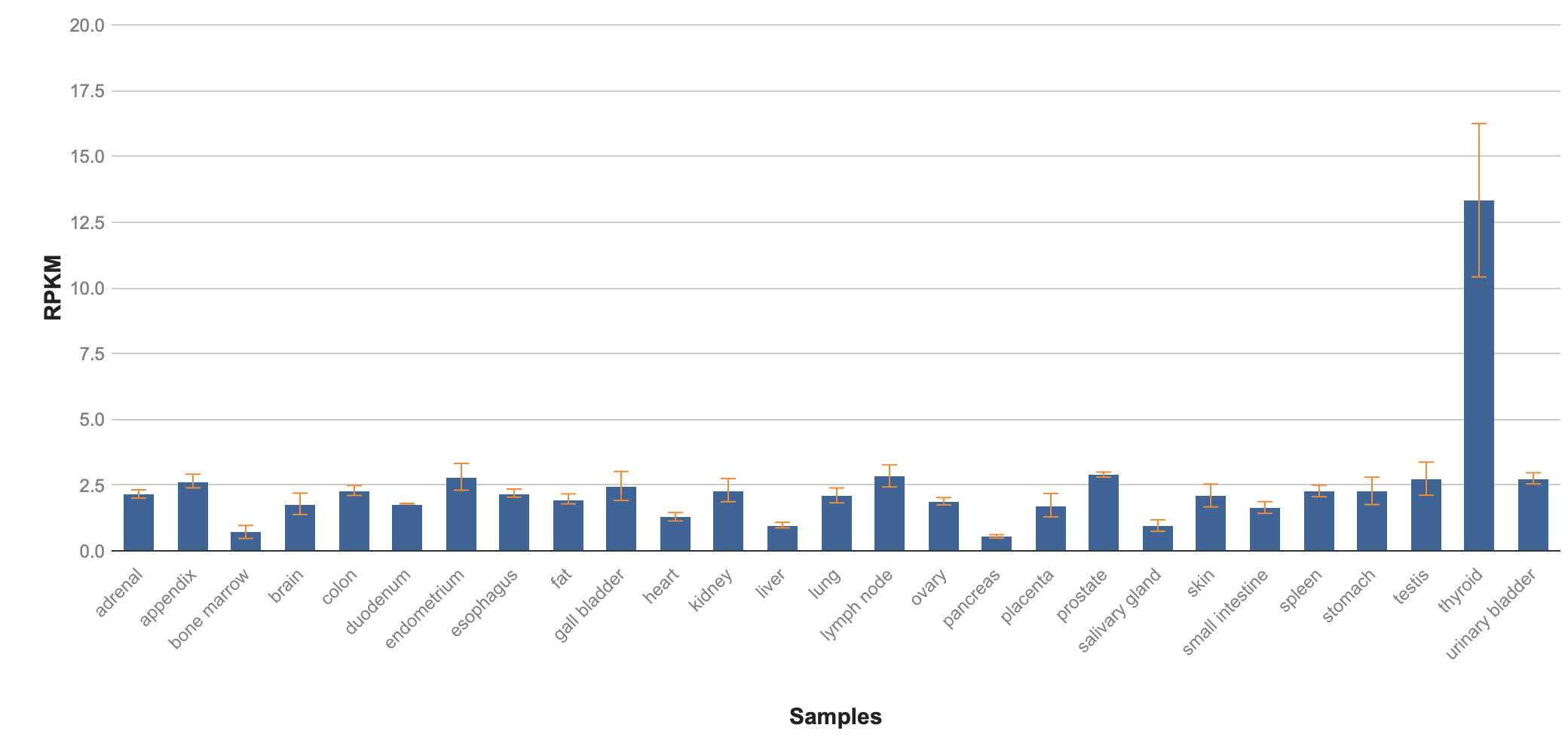
Expression data for TMEM267 in specific tissues.

== Interactions ==
=== Transcription factors ===
The table below describes a curated set of transcription factors which are predicted to bind in the Genomatix predicted TMEM267 promoter region.

Transcription factor	Detailed information
RU49	Zinc finger proliferation 1-Zipro
SORY	SOX-SOY-sex/testis determining and related HMG box factors
FKHD	Fork head domain factors
BRAC	Brachyury gene, mesoderm developmental factor
EVI1	EVI1-myleoid transformation protein
VTBP	Vertebrate TATA binding protein factor
RUSH	SWI/SNF related nucelophosphoproteins with RING finger DNA binding motif
NKXH	NKX homeodomain factors
BRN5	Brn-5 POU domains
PDX1	Pancreatic and intestinal homeodomain TF
CEBPA/B	CCAAT/Enhancer Binding Protein
CAAT	CCAAT binding factors
SPZ1	Testis-specific bHLH-Zip TFs
NFAT	Nuclear factor of activated T-cells
DMRT	DM- domain-containing TFs
ZF01	C2H2 zinc finger TF1
CREB	cAMP-responsive element binding proteins
XBBF	X-box binding factors
GCNR	Germ cell nuclear receptor
PLZF	C2H2 zinc finger protein PLZF

=== Interacting proteins ===
TMEM267 was predicted to interact with the proteins in the table below.

Protein Name	UniProt Label	Function	Location
TMEM52B	Q4KMG9	Function has not been studied	Integral component of membrane, extracellular region
TMEM14B	Q9NUH8	Involved in the cortical expansion and folding in the developing neocortex; may drive neural progenitor proliferation through nuclear translocation	Integral component of membrane
RTP2 (Receptor-transporting protein 2)	Q5QGT7	Promotes functional cell surface expression of olfactory receptor	Plasma membrane
SAR1A	Q9NR31	Involved in transport from the ER to the Golgi apparatus; SAR1S-GTP-dependent assembly of SEC16A on the ER membrane form an organized scaffold defining ER exit sites	ER, Golgi apparatus
STX7 (Syntaxin-7)	Q15400	May be involved in protein trafficking from the plasma membrane to early endosome; mediates trafficking from early to late endosomes and lysosomes	Endosome, plasma membrane
CPLX4 (Complexin-4)	Q7Z7G2	Regulates SNARE protein complex-mediated synaptic vesicle fusion	Plasma membrane
APP (Amyloid-beta precursor protein P4)	P05067	Functions as cell surface receptor in neurons; involved in cell mobility and transcription regulation	Extracellular region/secreted, plasma membrane, endosome, nucleus, cytoplasmic vesicle
EGFR	P00533	Ligand binding trigger receptor homo/heterodimerization and autophosphorylation on key cytoplasmic residues; this phosphorylated receptor recruits adaptor proteins which activate downstream signaling cascades	Nuclear membrane, ER membrane
LNPEP (Leucyl-cystinyl aminopeptidase)	Q9UIQ6	Release of an N-terminal amino acid, cleaves before cysteine and leucine; helps maintain homeostasis during pregnancy	Plasma membrane, extracellular region
ECM29	Q5VYK3	Adaptor/scaffolding protein which binds to specific proteins; may couple the proteasome to ER, endosome, and centrosome	Nucleus, centrosome, ER, endosome, cytoplasmic vesicle

== Homology and evolution ==
=== Orthologs and paralogs ===
TMEM267 has orthologs in Mammalia, Reptilia, Amphibia, Mollusca, Arthropoda, Branchiostoma, Trichoplax, Oomycetes, and Bacteria, among others, but has no paralogs. A table of select orthologs is listed below.

Genus and species	Common name	Taxonomic group	Estimated Date of Divergence (MYA)	Accession number	Sequence length (aa)	Sequence Alignment ! !Sequence similarity	
Nannospalax galili	Northern Israeli Blind Subterranean Mole	Rodentia	90	XP_008831143.1	215	85.19%	93%
Opisthocomus hoazin	Reptile Bird	Opisthocomiformes	312	XP_009941974.1	215	83.26%	92%
Protobothrops mucrosquamatus	Venomous pit viper	Squamata	312	XP_015672610.1	219	82.16%	89%
Xenopus Tropicalis	Tropical clawed frog	Anura	351.8	XP_031750178.1	215	74.88%	86%
Notothenia coriiceps	Antarctic Yellowbelly Rockcod	Perciformes	435	XP_010772860.1	244	67.21%	82%
Branchiostoma belcheri	Branchiostoma	Amphioxiformes	684	XP_019622820.1	215	32.09%	63%
Strongylocentrotus purpuratus	Purple Sea Urchin	Echinodermata	684	XP_030828106.1	221	36.3%	59%
Aethina tumida	Small Hive Beetle	Coleoptera	797	XP_019869992.1	201	35.82%	49%
Crassostrea gigas	Pacific Oyster	Ostreoida	797	XP_011423125.1	209	34.93%	52%

=== Evolution ===
TMEM267 is predicted to evolve slower than Fibrinogen Alpha Chain but faster than Cytochrome C.

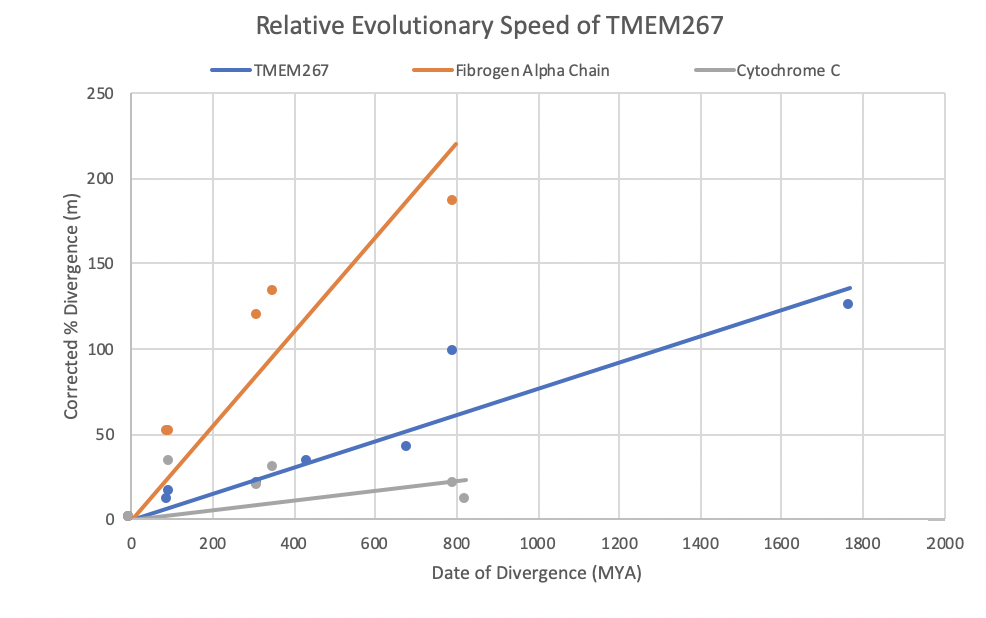
TMEM267 Evolutionary Graph

== Function ==
=== Clinical significance ===
The protein was identified as a member of a large group of proteins that comprise a filter in mammalian cells which allow selective passage of proteins in and out of the cilium, regulating the contents. TMEM267 was one of ten genes selected using the two-sample t-test and Wilcoxon Mann-Whitney analysis of training data on atopic dermatitis (a skin disease characterized by areas of severe itching, redness, scaling, and loss of the surface of the skin), as a gene that provided the most information about the separation between the control and experimental groups. TMEM267 is mentioned in articles pertaining to the down-regulation of two miRNAs, one of which is involved in regulating a wide variety of cellular functions, such as proliferation, apoptosis, migration, and differentiation, all of which are vital for the normal development of heart cells.

=== Cancer ===
TMEM267 protein was shown to be mutated in 0.1-0.9% of colorectal, stomach, lung, endometrial, kidney, and breast cancer. TMEM267 was affected by increased levels of the NUDT21 gene, and was identified as a part of a large group of possible oncogenes, that when the 3'-UTR is shortened, can cause uncontrollable cell growth. It is a part of a group of genes which can possibly identify survival rates of patients with PNI+ tongue cancer. TMEM267 was shown to be one of 26 over-expressed genes on chromosome 5p, meaning it belongs to a group of genes which likely provides cancer cells with advantages in growth and invasion of surrounding cells. In addition, researchers from The Johns Hopkins University filed a patent for 63 genes, including TMEM267 which had increased expression in the presence of HMGA1 protein compared to the control group, which they think could be of use in a method of inhibiting cancer stem cells with HMGA1 inhibitors.
