= Tubby protein =

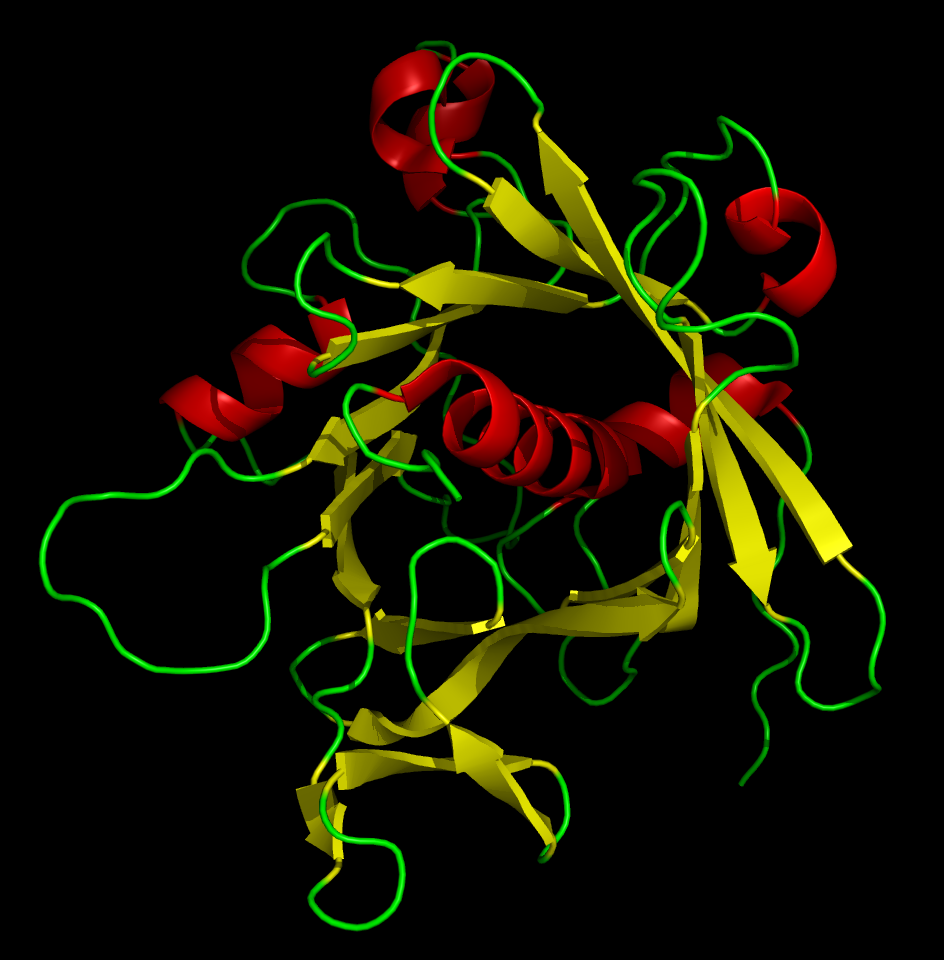
- A tubby protein expressed in mouse brain

Identifiers
- Symbol: Tub
- Pfam: PF01167
- InterPro: IPR000007
- PROSITE: PDOC00923
- SCOP2: 1c8z / SCOPe / SUPFAM
- OPM superfamily: 104
- OPM protein: 1i7e
Available protein structures:
- PDB: 1s31A:258-500 1i7eA:257-499 1c8zA:257-499 IPR000007 PF01167 (ECOD; PDBsum)
- AlphaFold: IPR000007; PF01167

The tubby protein is encoded by the TUB gene. It is an upstream cell signaling protein common to multicellular eukaryotes. The first tubby gene was identified in mice, and proteins that are homologous to tubby are known as "tubby-like proteins" (TULPs). They share a common and characteristic tertiary structure that consists of a beta barrel packed around an alpha helix in the central pore. The gene derives its name from its role in metabolism; mice with a mutated tubby gene develop delayed-onset obesity, sensorineural hearing loss, and retinal degeneration.

== Structure ==
Tubby proteins are classified as α+β proteins and have a 12-beta stranded barrel surrounding a central alpha helix. Tubby proteins can bind the small cell signaling molecule phosphatidylinositol, which is typically localized to the cell membrane. A similar structural fold to the tubby-like proteins has been identified in the scramblase family of proteins.

== Function ==
Tubby proteins have been implicated as transcription factors, and as potential signaling factors coupled to G-protein activity. They are associated with neuronal differentiation and development, and in mammals are implicated in three disease processes when mutated: obesity, retinal degeneration, and hearing loss. In mice, mutations in tubby proteins are known to affect life span and fat storage as well as carbohydrate metabolism. Tubby domains associate with the cytoplasmic side of cell membranes through binding of different phosphoinositides.

== Human proteins containing this domain ==
TUB; TULP1; TULP2; TULP3; TULP4;
