= PLSCR3 =

Protein-coding gene in the species Homo sapiens

Identifiers
- Aliases: PLSCR3, phospholipid scramblase 3
- External IDs: OMIM: 607611; MGI: 1917560; GeneCards: PLSCR3

Gene location (Human)
Chr.	Chromosome 17 (human)
Band	17p13.1	Start	7,389,727 bp
Band	17p13.1	End	7,394,843 bp

Gene location (Mouse)
Chr.	Chromosome 11 (mouse)
Band	11 B3|11 42.9 cM	Start	69,737,202 bp
Band	11 B3|11 42.9 cM	End	69,742,884 bp
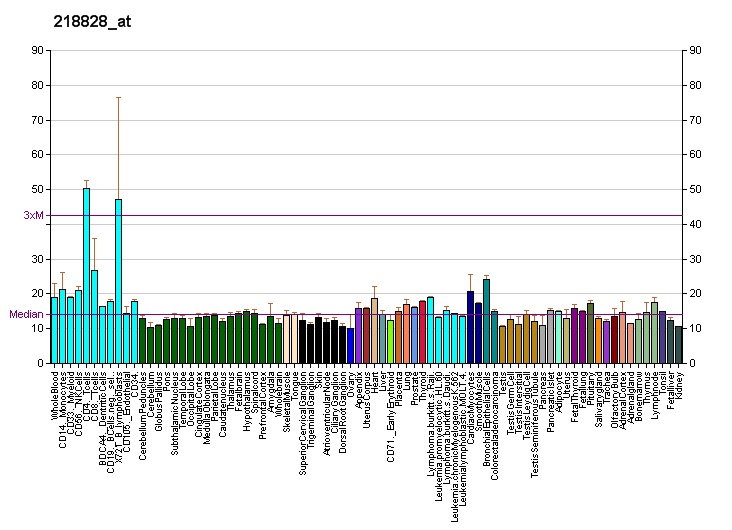

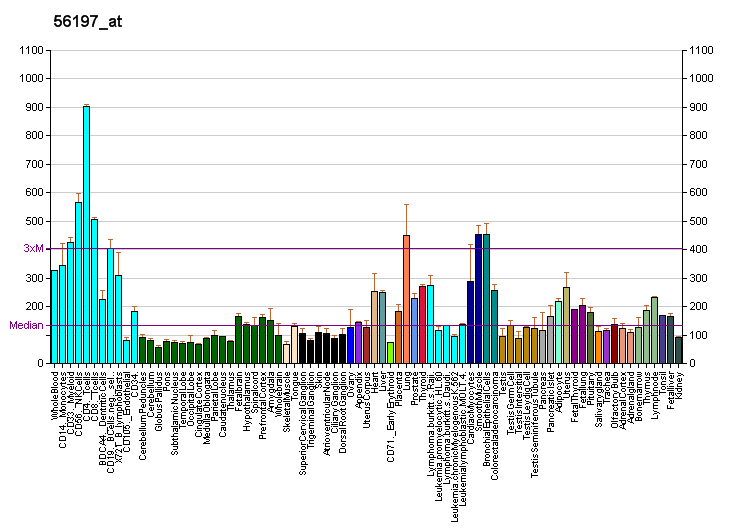
RNA expression pattern
Bgee	Human / Mouse (ortholog); Top expressed in: granulocyte; stromal cell of endometrium; right coronary artery; left coronary artery; ectocervix; Descending thoracic aorta; ascending aorta; tibial nerve; apex of heart; body of uterus / Top expressed in: lip; external carotid artery; internal carotid artery; molar; calvaria; lumbar spinal ganglion; endothelial cell of lymphatic vessel; atrium; lung; transitional epithelium of urinary bladder; More reference expression data
BioGPS	More reference expression data
Gene ontology
Molecular function	SH3 domain binding; phospholipid scramblase activity; calcium ion binding; protein binding; calcium-dependent protein binding
Cellular component	integral component of membrane; plasma membrane; mitochondrial membranes; membrane; mitochondrion
Biological process	cholesterol homeostasis; cellular response to lipopolysaccharide; plasma membrane phospholipid scrambling; glucose homeostasis; apoptotic process
Sources:Amigo / QuickGO
Orthologs
Databases	NCBI: entry; OMA: entry
Species	Human	Mouse
Entrez	57048	70310
Ensembl	ENSG00000187838; ENSG00000284009	ENSMUSG00000019461
UniProt	Q9NRY6	Q9JIZ9
RefSeq (mRNA)	NM_020360; NM_001201576	NM_001168497; NM_023564
RefSeq (protein)	NP_001188505; NP_065093; NP_001356336; NP_001356349; NP_001356350 NP_001356351	NP_001161969; NP_076053
Location (UCSC)	Chr 17: 7.39 – 7.39 Mb	Chr 11: 69.74 – 69.74 Mb
PubMed search
- Wikidata
View/Edit Human	View/Edit Mouse

Phospholipid scramblase 3 is an enzyme that in humans is encoded by the PLSCR3 gene (abbreviated to PLS3 in this section). Like the other phospholipid scramblase family members (PLS1, PLS2, PLS4), PLS3 is a type II plasma membrane protein that is rich in proline and integral in apoptosis, or programmed cell death. The regulation of apoptosis is critical for both cell development and tissue homeostasis

Although phospholipid scramblase is thought to exist in all eukaryotic cells, PLS3 is a protein that is novel to the mitochondria. This is very important because mitochondria are central in the apoptotic cell pathway. This newly found member of the scramblase family is "responsible for phospholipid translocation between two lipid compartments," the inner mitochondrial membrane and the outer membrane. Further experimental evidence suggests that the mechanism and effectors of PLS3's enzymatic activity are rather nuanced.

== Effect on mitochondrial cardiolipin ==
Cardiolipin is a mitochondrion-specific phospholipid found in both the mitochondrial inner and outer membranes Many studies speculate that cardiolipin is a likely player in mitochondrial apoptosis. In a study done by R Lee et al., it was found that during apoptosis, cardiolipin in the outer membrane of the mitochondria increased from 10% to 30% saturation. Finding that cardiolipin concentration in the outer mitochondrial membrane increased during apoptosis (as well as knowing the function that PLS3 plays in mitochondrial apoptotic effects) clued Lee in to the fact that PLS3 may have effects on this cardiolipin membrane redistribution. Lee’s study looked into the consequences of cardiolipin redistribution in the mitochondria and found that cardiolipin plays a critical role in proteins that are involved with oxidative respiration (such as ATP synthase), which in turn affects ATP production. In Lee's experiment determining the effect of cardiolipin deprivation on cells, he studied an infected yeast mutant that lacked a cardiolipin creating enzyme, and found that although it was viable, the yeast was "moderately deficient in mitochondrial energy transforming machinery."

It was subsequently deduced that PLS3 is an effector for the redistribution of cardiolipin from the inner to outer mitochondrial membrane. Thus, when PLS3 flips cardiolipin across the inner to outer membrane of the mitochondria, the oxidative phosphorylation induced is greatly disturbed. It was deduced experimentally that a lack of proper oxidative phosphorylation is directly linked with mitochondrial apoptosis. Thus, this PLS3-induced redistribution of cardiolipin during apoptosis has major effects on mitochondrial function.

== Summary ==
Although the results of the experiments above are very intriguing and shed light on what was once a mystery, there have been only a few experiments that have targeted PSL3. And, furthermore, in a majority of the experiments and studies that were reviewed, it is evident that there is some doubt in the experimental findings

== See also ==
- Scramblase
