= Phospholipid scramblase =

Protein

Scramblase
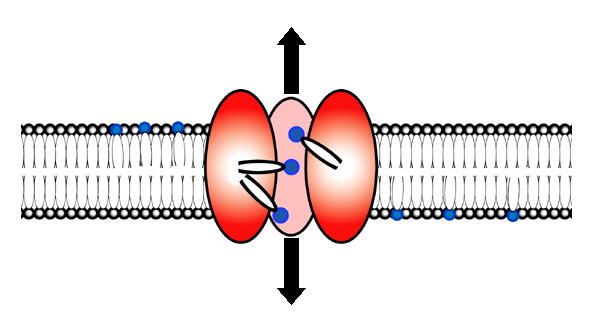

Identifiers
- Symbol: Scramblase
- Pfam: PF03803
- Pfam clan: CL0395
- InterPro: IPR005552
- Membranome: 231
Available protein structures:
- PDB: IPR005552 PF03803 (ECOD; PDBsum)
- AlphaFold: IPR005552; PF03803

Phospholipid scramblase 1

Identifiers
- Symbol: PLSCR1
- NCBI gene: 5359
- HGNC: 9092
- OMIM: 604170
- RefSeq: NM_021105
- UniProt: O15162

Other data
- Locus: Chr. 3 q23
Search for
- Structures: Swiss-model
- Domains: InterPro

Phospholipid scramblase 2

Identifiers
- Symbol: PLSCR2
- NCBI gene: 57047
- HGNC: 16494
- OMIM: 607610
- RefSeq: NM_020359
- UniProt: Q9NRY7

Other data
- Locus: Chr. 3 q24
Search for
- Structures: Swiss-model
- Domains: InterPro

Phospholipid scramblase 3

Identifiers
- Symbol: PLSCR3
- NCBI gene: 57048
- HGNC: 16495
- OMIM: 607611
- RefSeq: NM_020360.1
- UniProt: Q9NRY6

Other data
- Locus: Chr. 17 p13.1
Search for
- Structures: Swiss-model
- Domains: InterPro

Phospholipid scramblase 4

Identifiers
- Symbol: PLSCR4
- NCBI gene: 57088
- HGNC: 16497
- OMIM: 607612
- RefSeq: NM_020353
- UniProt: Q9NRQ2

Other data
- Locus: Chr. 3 q24
Search for
- Structures: Swiss-model
- Domains: InterPro

Phospholipid scramblase family, member 5

Identifiers
- Symbol: PLSCR5
- NCBI gene: 389158
- HGNC: 19952
- RefSeq: XM_371670
- UniProt: A0PG75

Other data
- Locus: Chr. 3 q24
Search for
- Structures: Swiss-model
- Domains: InterPro

Scramblase is a protein responsible for the translocation of phospholipids between the two monolayers of a lipid bilayer of a cell membrane. In humans, phospholipid scramblases (PLSCRs) constitute a family of five homologous proteins that are named as hPLSCR1–hPLSCR5. Scramblases are members of the general family of transmembrane lipid transporters known as flippases. Scramblases are distinct from flippases and floppases. Scramblases, flippases, and floppases are three different types of enzymatic groups of phospholipid transportation enzymes. The inner-leaflet, facing the inside of the cell, contains negatively charged amino-phospholipids and phosphatidylethanolamine. The outer-leaflet, facing the outside environment, contains phosphatidylcholine and sphingomyelin. Scramblase is an enzyme, present in the cell membrane, that can transport (scramble) the negatively charged phospholipids from the inner-leaflet to the outer-leaflet, and vice versa.

== Tissue distribution ==
Whereas hPLSCR1, -3, and -4 are expressed in a variety of tissues with few exceptions, expression of hPLSCR2 is restricted only to the testis. hPLSCR4 is not expressed in peripheral blood lymphocytes, whereas hPLSCR1 and -3 were not detected in the brain. However, the functional significance of this differential gene expression is not yet understood. While the gene and the mRNA of hPLSCR5 provide evidence of its existence, the protein has yet to be described in the literature.

== Structure ==
Scramblase proteins contain a region of conservation that possesses a 12-stranded beta barrel surrounding a central alpha helix. This structure shows similarity to the Tubby protein.

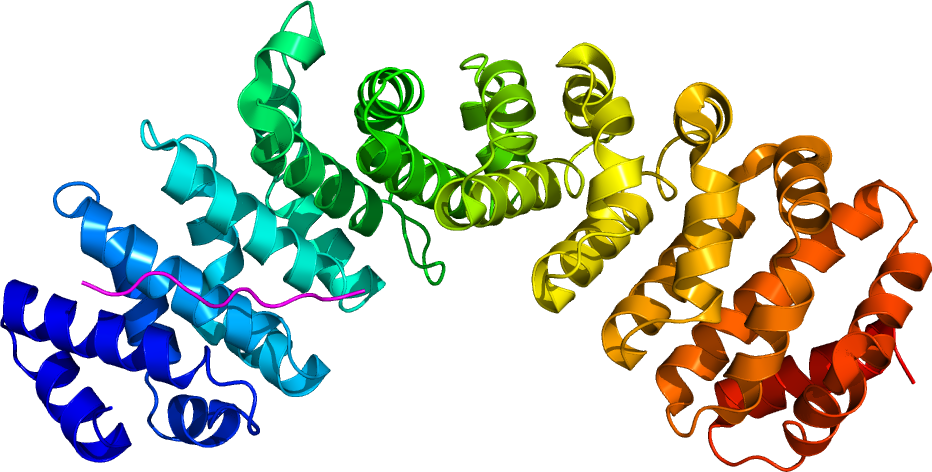
Structure of mouse importin (rainbow colored cartoon, N-terminus = blue, C-terminus = red) bound the nuclear localisation sequence of PLSCR1 scramblase (magenta tube; left hand side of figure).

Phospholipid scramblase 1 (PLSCR1), a lipid-binding protein that enters the nucleus via the nonclassical NLS (257)GKISKHWTGI(266). The structure of the nuclear localisation sequence of scramblase PLSCR1 complexed to importin was determined using X-ray diffraction with a resolution of 2.20 Ångströms. It is found in most mammals including humans. The import sequence lacks a continuous stretch of positively charged residues, and it is enriched in hydrophobic residues. Thus, Scramblase can transport negatively charged phospholipids from the inside of the cell to the outside of the cell. The importin structure is composed of many alpha helices that integrate the protein into membranes. The role of importin is to move proteins such as scramblase into the nucleus.

== Enzyme activation ==
The enzymatic activity of scramblase depends on the calcium concentration present inside the cell. The calcium concentration inside cells is, under normal conditions, very low; therefore, scramblase has a low activity under resting conditions. Phospholipid redistribution is triggered by increased cytosolic calcium and seems to be scramblase-dependent, resulting in a symmetric distribution of negatively charged phospholipids between both leaflets of the lipid bilayer. All scramblases contain an EF hand-like Ca^{2+}binding domain that is probably responsible for the calcium activation of the enzyme. The activity of scramblase does not require energy, meaning that there is no contribution of adenosine triphosphate in the process.

Scramblases are proline-rich proteins, possessing many cysteinyl sulfhydryl groups that are prone to modifications. Oxidation, nitrosylation, and blockage of these sulfhydryl groups produce an enhanced scramblase activity. Patients with sickle cell disease exhibit a fraction of erythrocytes with an aberrantly enhanced exposure of phosphatidyl serine on their surface. As the erythrocytes of these patients have an enhanced oxidative stress, it is probable that increased scramblase activity might play a role in the etiology of the disease. Furthermore, it is well recognized that both reactive oxygen species and intracellular Ca^{2+} fluxes affect mitochondria at the beginning of the apoptotic program. Sulfhydryl modification of PLSCR3 in mitochondria during apoptosis may be a key regulator initiating the intrinsic apoptotic pathways.

== Function ==
=== Mitochondrial membrane maintenance ===
Recent findings suggest that PLSCR3 is involved in regulation of biosynthesis of cardiolipin in mitochondria, and its overexpression in cultured cells resulted in increased cardiolipin synthase activity. As cardiolipin is synthesized in the luminal side of inner mitochondrial membrane, a major fraction of this newly synthesized pool of cardiolipin has to be translocated from the inner to the outer mitochondrial membrane. PLSCR3 has been proposed to be involved in this translocation from the inner to the outer membrane that is essential for maintaining the mitochondrial architecture, mass, and transmembrane potential.

=== Lipid metabolism ===
Recent findings suggest that PLSCR3 and, to a lesser degree, PLSCR1 are critical to the normal regulation of fat accumulation in mice. In addition to blood cells, PLSCR3 is expressed to a significantly higher level in fat and muscle cells, which are actively involved in fat metabolism. PLSCR3 knockout mice showed an aberrant abdominal fat accumulation, glucose intolerance, insulin resistance, and dyslipidemia as compared to controlled mice. Cultured fat cells from PLSCR3 knockout mice were engorged with neutral lipids. Blood plasma of these mice showed elevated levels of non-high-density lipoproteins, cholesterol, triglycerides, non-esterified fatty acids, and leptin, but low adiponectin content. Abdominal fat accumulation with the formation of enlarged lipid engorged adipocytes has emerged as the key risk factor for the onset of type 2 diabetes, which is often a manifestation of a broader underlying metabolic disorder termed as metabolic syndrome. Further studies on the regulation of lipid metabolism by PLSCRs are required to understand the risk for development of similar diseases in humans when PLSCR genes are mutated, leading to a defective expression and/or function of PLSCR proteins.

=== Thrombosis ===
Upon activation (in platelets) or injury (in erythrocytes, platelets, endothelium, and other cells), certain cells expose the phospholipid phosphatidylserine on their surface and act as catalysts to induce the coagulation cascade. Surface exposure of phosphatidylserine is thought to be brought about by the activation of scramblases. Several enzyme complexes of blood coagulation cascade such as tenase and prothrombinase are activated by the cell surface exposure of the phosphatidylserine. However, the most studied member of the scramblase family PLSCR1 was shown to be defective in translocation of phospholipids when reconstituted into proteoliposomes in vitro. Although recent studies show that PLSCR1 is neither sufficient nor necessary for the phosphatidylserine externalization, the involvement of PLSCR1 in blood coagulation remains elusive, raising the question of additional membrane components in the externalization pathway. To date, no report is available on the involvement of any other identified member of PLSCRs in blood clotting.

=== Apoptosis ===
Apoptotic cell death is characterized by a proteolytic caspase cascade that emanates from either an extrinsic or an intrinsic pathway. The extrinsic pathway is initiated by membrane bound death receptors, leading to activation of caspase 8, whereas the intrinsic pathway is triggered by DNA damaging drugs and UV radiation, leading to mitochondrial depolarization and subsequent activation of caspase 9. PLSCRs are supposed to play an important role in both intrinsic and extrinsic apoptotic responses that are linked to each other via the activation of caspase 8. Activated caspase 8 causes the cleavage of the amino terminal portion of the cytosolic protein Bid to generate t-Bid that is translocated into mitochondria during apoptosis. hPLSCR1 and its mitochondrial counterpart hPLSCR3 are phosphorylated by PKCδ during PKC-δ-induced apoptosis. While the consequence of hPLSCR1 phosphorylation and its mechanism of action during cellular apoptotic response remain unclear, phosphorylated hPLSCR3 is thought to facilitate mitochondrial targeting of t-Bid that is an essential requirement in caspase 8-mediated apoptosis. The active t-Bid fragment is shown to localize to mitochondria through a positive interaction with cardiolipin. This activated t-Bid induces activation of Bax and Bak proteins to form cytochrome c channels that facilitate the release of cytochrome c during apoptosis.

An early morphological event in both the extrinsic and the intrinsic apoptotic pathways is the surface exposure of the phospholipid phosphatidylserine, about 96% of which normally reside in the cytosolic leaflet of the plasma membrane. Phosphatidylserine is translocated to the exoplasmic leaflet by the activation of scramblases, leading to pro-coagulant properties and providing a phagocytic signal to the macrophages that engulf and clear the apoptotic cells. The involvement of other associated proteins aiding scrambling activity cannot be ruled out.
