= TFG (gene) =

Protein-coding gene in the species Homo sapiens

Identifiers
- Aliases: TFG, HMSNP, SPG57, TF6, TRKT3, TRK-fused gene, trafficking from ER to golgi regulator
- External IDs: OMIM: 602498; MGI: 1338041; GeneCards: TFG

Gene location (Human)
Chr.	Chromosome 3 (human)
Band	3q12.2	Start	100,709,295 bp
Band	3q12.2	End	100,748,964 bp

Gene location (Mouse)
Chr.	Chromosome 16 (mouse)
Band	16|16 C1.1	Start	56,510,695 bp
Band	16|16 C1.1	End	56,537,813 bp
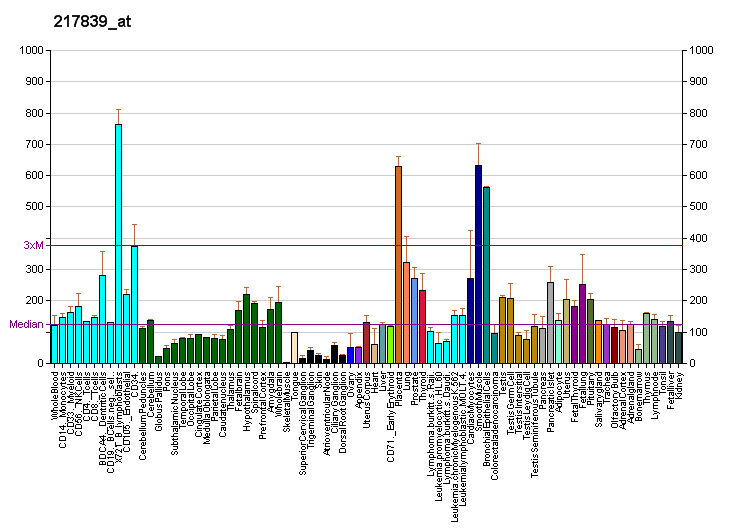
RNA expression pattern
Bgee	Human / Mouse (ortholog); Top expressed in: secondary oocyte; jejunal mucosa; gingival epithelium; duodenum; tibia; parietal pleura; stromal cell of endometrium; smooth muscle tissue; rectum; oral cavity / Top expressed in: gastrula; epithelium of small intestine; tail of embryo; genital tubercle; seminal vesicula; parotid gland; jejunum; molar; ileum; mandibular prominence; More reference expression data
BioGPS	More reference expression data
Gene ontology
Molecular function	protein binding; signal transducer activity; identical protein binding
Cellular component	cytoplasm; cytosol; extracellular exosome; Golgi membrane; endoplasmic reticulum exit site; endoplasmic reticulum
Biological process	positive regulation of I-kappaB kinase/NF-kappaB signaling; signal transduction; endoplasmic reticulum to Golgi vesicle-mediated transport; COPII vesicle coating
Sources:Amigo / QuickGO
Orthologs
Databases	NCBI: entry; OMA: entry
Species	Human	Mouse
Entrez	10342	21787
Ensembl	ENSG00000114354	ENSMUSG00000022757
UniProt	Q92734	n/a
RefSeq (mRNA)	NM_001007565; NM_001195478; NM_001195479; NM_006070	NM_001252443; NM_019678; NM_001357124; NM_001357125; NM_001357126
RefSeq (protein)	NP_001007566; NP_001182407; NP_001182408; NP_006061	n/a
Location (UCSC)	Chr 3: 100.71 – 100.75 Mb	Chr 16: 56.51 – 56.54 Mb
PubMed search
- Wikidata
View/Edit Human	View/Edit Mouse

Protein TFG is a protein that in humans is encoded by the TFG gene.

== Interactions ==
TFG (gene) has been shown to interact with PLSCR1.
