= PLSCR5 =

Protein-coding gene in the species Homo sapiens

Identifiers
- Aliases: PLSCR5, phospholipid scramblase family member 5
- External IDs: MGI: 3779462; GeneCards: PLSCR5

Gene location (Human)
Chr.	Chromosome 3 (human)
Band	3q24	Start	146,576,555 bp
Band	3q24	End	146,605,346 bp

Gene location (Mouse)
Chr.	Chromosome 9 (mouse)
Band	9|9 E3.3	Start	92,074,989 bp
Band	9|9 E3.3	End	92,091,825 bp
RNA expression pattern
Bgee	Human / Mouse (ortholog); Top expressed in: testicle; gonad; caudate nucleus; putamen; prefrontal cortex; superior frontal gyrus; anterior pituitary; muscle layer of sigmoid colon; nucleus accumbens; hypothalamus / Top expressed in: granulocyte; spermatocyte; hypothalamus; neural tube; heart; gonad; testicle; More reference expression data
BioGPS	n/a
Gene ontology
Molecular function	phospholipid scramblase activity
Cellular component	plasma membrane
Biological process	plasma membrane phospholipid scrambling
Sources:Amigo / QuickGO
Orthologs
Databases	NCBI: entry; OMA: entry
Species	Human	Mouse
Entrez	389158	100504689
Ensembl	ENSG00000231213	ENSMUSG00000095654
UniProt	A0PG75	J3QM92
RefSeq (mRNA)	NM_001085420; NM_001321245	NM_001195693
RefSeq (protein)	NP_001078889; NP_001308174	NP_001182622
Location (UCSC)	Chr 3: 146.58 – 146.61 Mb	Chr 9: 92.07 – 92.09 Mb
PubMed search
- Wikidata
View/Edit Human	View/Edit Mouse

Phospholipid scramblase family member 5 is a protein that in humans is encoded by the PLSCR5 gene.

== See also ==
- scramblase
