= WWP1 =

Protein-coding gene in the species Homo sapiens

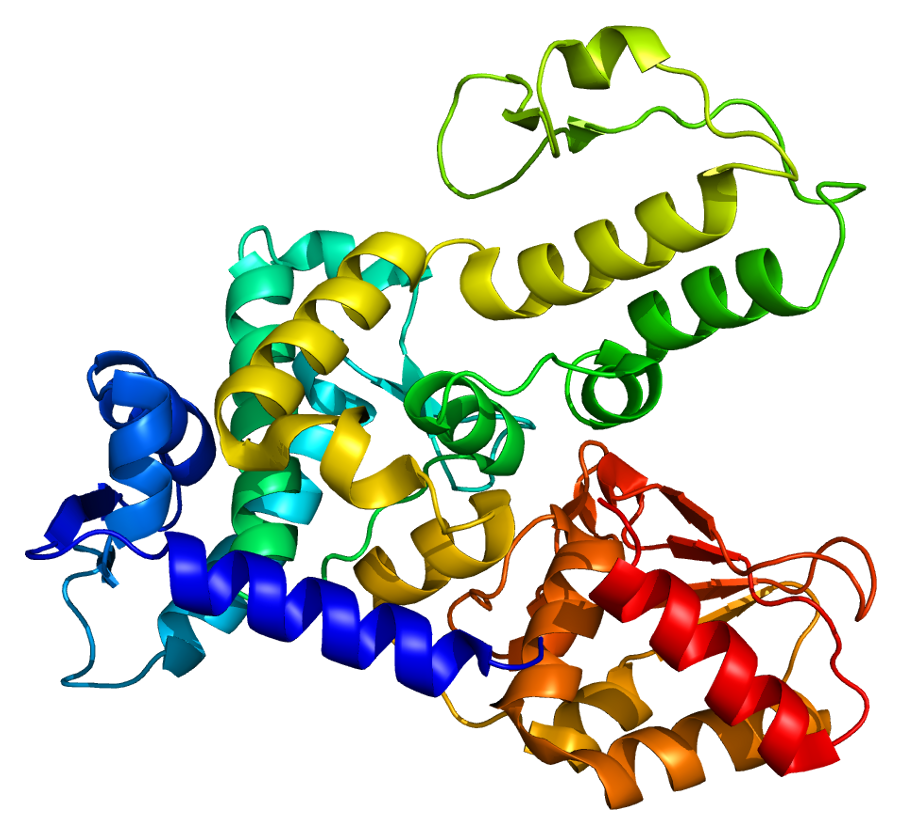

Identifiers
- Aliases: WWP1, AIP5, Tiul1, hSDRP1, WW domain containing E3 ubiquitin protein ligase 1
- External IDs: OMIM: 602307; MGI: 1861728; GeneCards: WWP1
Available structures
PDB	Ortholog search: PDBe RCSB
PDB	List of PDB id codes 1ND7, 5HPS, 5HPT
Enzyme activity
EC #	BRENDA	ExPASy	KEGG	MetaCyc
2.3.2.26	↗	↗	↗	↗

Gene location (Human)
Chr.	Chromosome 8 (human)
Band	8q21.3	Start	86,342,547 bp
Band	8q21.3	End	86,478,420 bp

Gene location (Mouse)
Chr.	Chromosome 4 (mouse)
Band	4|4 A3	Start	19,608,303 bp
Band	4|4 A3	End	19,708,993 bp
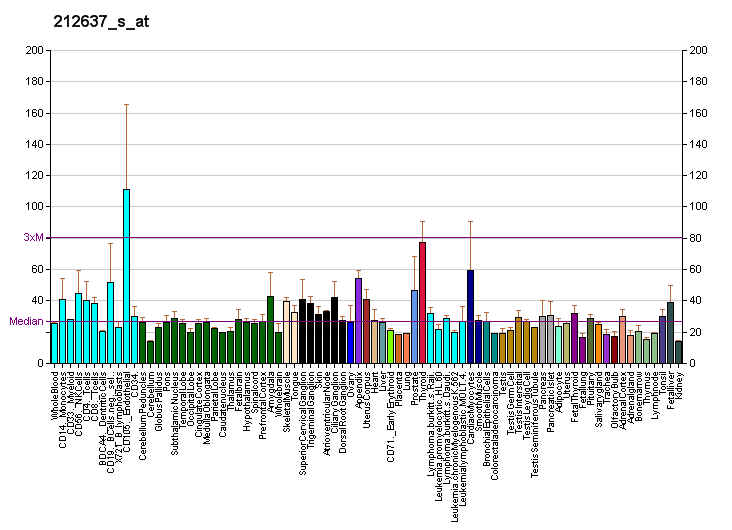

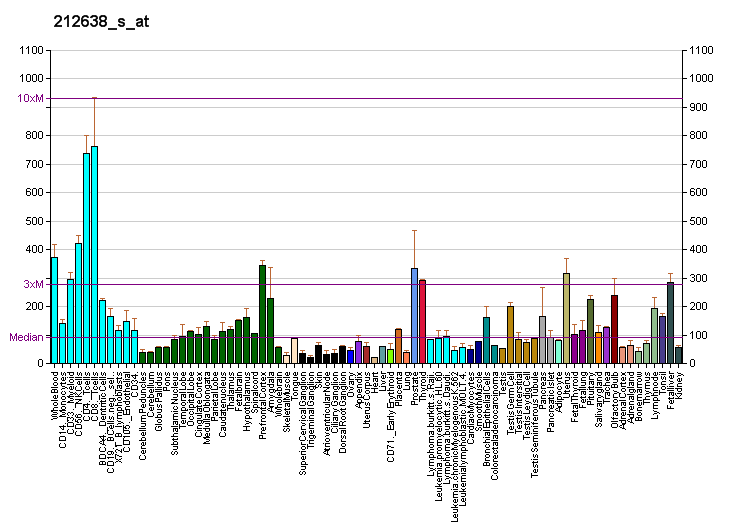
RNA expression pattern
Bgee	Human / Mouse (ortholog); Top expressed in: Skeletal muscle tissue of rectus abdominis; Skeletal muscle tissue of biceps brachii; body of tongue; corpus epididymis; caput epididymis; superior surface of tongue; lactiferous duct; tail of epididymis; mucosa of pharynx; vastus lateralis muscle / Top expressed in: stroma of bone marrow; triceps brachii muscle; extraocular muscle; sternocleidomastoid muscle; vastus lateralis muscle; muscle of thigh; ankle; temporal muscle; digastric muscle; gastrocnemius muscle; More reference expression data
BioGPS	More reference expression data
Gene ontology
Molecular function	protein binding; ubiquitin-protein transferase activity; transferase activity; ubiquitin protein ligase activity
Cellular component	ubiquitin ligase complex; cytosol; plasma membrane; extracellular exosome; membrane; nucleus; cytoplasm
Biological process	viral entry into host cell; central nervous system development; ion transmembrane transport; viral process; negative regulation of transcription, DNA-templated; protein ubiquitination; signal transduction; ubiquitin-dependent protein catabolic process; proteasome-mediated ubiquitin-dependent protein catabolic process; protein polyubiquitination; positive regulation of protein catabolic process
Sources:Amigo / QuickGO
Orthologs
Databases	NCBI: entry; OMA: entry
Species	Human	Mouse
Entrez	11059	107568
Ensembl	ENSG00000123124	ENSMUSG00000041058
UniProt	Q9H0M0	Q8BZZ3
RefSeq (mRNA)	NM_007013	NM_001276292; NM_177327; NM_001355222
RefSeq (protein)	NP_008944	NP_001263221; NP_796301; NP_001342151
Location (UCSC)	Chr 8: 86.34 – 86.48 Mb	Chr 4: 19.61 – 19.71 Mb
PubMed search
- Wikidata
View/Edit Human	View/Edit Mouse

NEDD4-like E3 ubiquitin-protein ligase WWP1 is an enzyme that in humans is encoded by the WWP1 gene.

== Function ==
WW domain-containing proteins are found in all eukaryotes and play an important role in the regulation of a wide variety of cellular functions such as protein degradation, transcription, and RNA splicing. This gene encodes a protein which contains 4 tandem WW domains and a HECT (homologous to the E6-associated protein carboxyl terminus) domain. The encoded protein belongs to a family of NEDD4-like proteins, which are E3 ubiquitin-ligase molecules and regulate key trafficking decisions, including targeting of proteins to proteosomes or lysosomes. Alternative splicing of this gene generates at least 6 transcript variants; however, the full length nature of these transcripts has not been defined. In neurons, murine ortholog Wwp1 and its homolog Wwp2 control polarity acquisition, formation, and branching of axons, as well as migration of newly born nerve cells into the cortical plate.

== Interactions ==
WWP1 has been shown to interact with:

- CPSF6,
- KLF2, and
- Reticulon 4
