= Phospholipid scramblase 1 =

Protein-coding gene in the species Homo sapiens

PLSCR1

Identifiers
- Aliases: PLSCR1, MMTRA1B, phospholipid scramblase 1
- External IDs: OMIM: 604170; MGI: 893575; GeneCards: PLSCR1
Available structures
PDB	Ortholog search: PDBe RCSB
PDB	List of PDB id codes 1Y2A

Gene location (Human)
Chr.	Chromosome 3 (human)
Band	3q24	Start	146,515,180 bp
Band	3q24	End	146,544,856 bp

Gene location (Mouse)
Chr.	Chromosome 9 (mouse)
Band	9|9 E3.3	Start	92,131,803 bp
Band	9|9 E3.3	End	92,154,331 bp
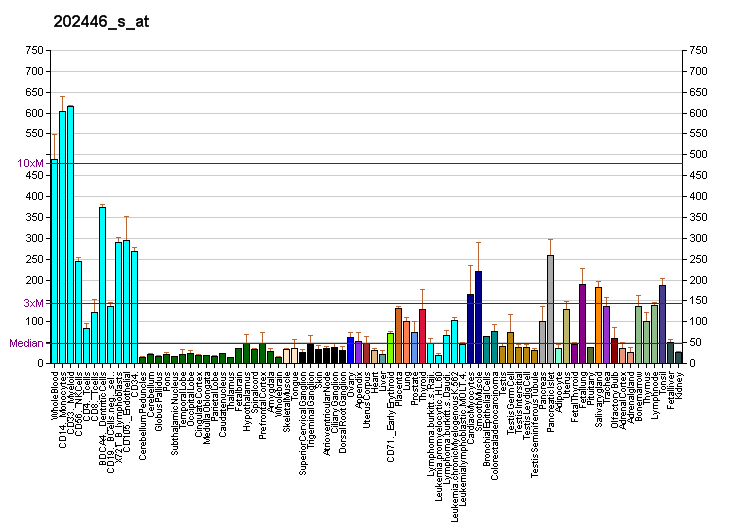

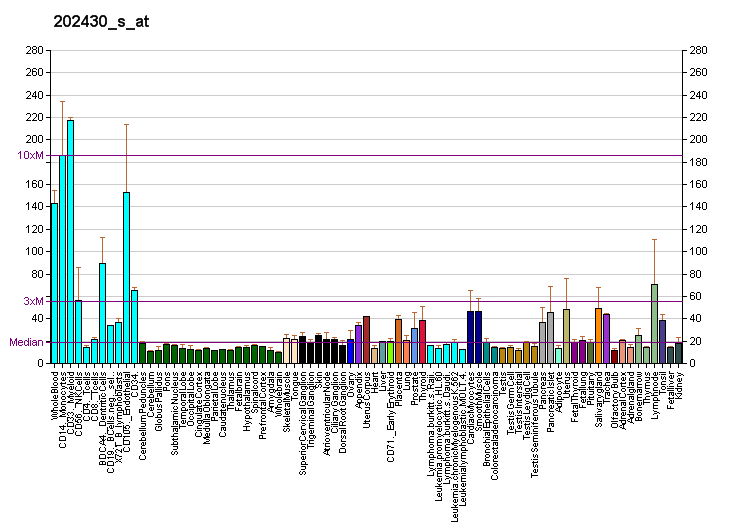
RNA expression pattern
Bgee	Human / Mouse (ortholog); Top expressed in: palpebral conjunctiva; monocyte; caput epididymis; gallbladder; germinal epithelium; pericardium; mucosa of sigmoid colon; tail of epididymis; epithelium of nasopharynx; rectum / Top expressed in: ileum; granulocyte; colon; yolk sac; jejunum; duodenum; proximal tubule; right kidney; lung; human kidney; More reference expression data
BioGPS	More reference expression data
Gene ontology
Molecular function	phospholipid scramblase activity; DNA binding; calcium ion binding; CD4 receptor binding; SH3 domain binding; epidermal growth factor receptor binding; DNA-binding transcription activator activity, RNA polymerase II-specific; protein binding; enzyme binding
Cellular component	integral component of membrane; cytosol; Golgi apparatus; membrane; extracellular matrix; plasma membrane; integral component of plasma membrane; nucleolus; membrane raft; extracellular exosome; nucleus; cytoplasm; perinuclear region of cytoplasm; collagen-containing extracellular matrix
Biological process	phosphatidylserine biosynthetic process; regulation of mast cell activation; plasma membrane phospholipid scrambling; positive regulation of DNA topoisomerase (ATP-hydrolyzing) activity; response to interferon-beta; regulation of Fc receptor mediated stimulatory signaling pathway; platelet activation; negative regulation of viral genome replication; positive regulation of gene expression; defense response to virus; acute-phase response; positive regulation of innate immune response; positive regulation of transcription by RNA polymerase II; apoptotic process; transcription by RNA polymerase II
Sources:Amigo / QuickGO
Orthologs
Databases	NCBI: entry; OMA: entry
Species	Human	Mouse
Entrez	5359	22038
Ensembl	ENSG00000188313	ENSMUSG00000032369
UniProt	O15162	Q9JJ00
RefSeq (mRNA)	NM_021105; NM_001363872; NM_001363874	NM_011636
RefSeq (protein)	NP_066928; NP_001350801; NP_001350803	NP_035766
Location (UCSC)	Chr 3: 146.52 – 146.54 Mb	Chr 9: 92.13 – 92.15 Mb
PubMed search
- Wikidata
View/Edit Human	View/Edit Mouse

Phospholipid scramblase 1 (PL scramblase 1) is an enzyme that in humans is encoded by the PLSCR1 gene.

== Interactions ==
PLSCR1 has been shown to interact with:

- CPSF6,
- Epidermal growth factor receptor,
- NEU4,
- SHC1,
- SLPI, and
- TFG.

== See also ==
- Scramblase
