= PLSCR2 =

Protein-coding gene in the species Homo sapiens

Identifiers
- Aliases: PLSCR2, phospholipid scramblase 2
- External IDs: OMIM: 607610; GeneCards: PLSCR2

Gene location (Human)
Chr.	Chromosome 3 (human)
Band	3q24	Start	146,391,421 bp
Band	3q24	End	146,495,991 bp
RNA expression pattern
Bgee	Human / Mouse (ortholog); Top expressed in: sperm; testicle; left testis; right testis; granulocyte; monocyte; islet of Langerhans; body of pancreas; gallbladder; rectum / n/a; More reference expression data
BioGPS	n/a
Gene ontology
Molecular function	phospholipid scramblase activity; calcium ion binding; metal ion binding
Cellular component	integral component of membrane; plasma membrane; membrane; nucleus
Biological process	plasma membrane phospholipid scrambling
Sources:Amigo / QuickGO
Orthologs
Databases	NCBI: entry; OMA: entry
Species	Human	Mouse
Entrez	57047	n/a
Ensembl	ENSG00000163746	n/a
UniProt	Q9NRY7	n/a
RefSeq (mRNA)	NM_001199978; NM_001199979; NM_020359	n/a
RefSeq (protein)	NP_001186907; NP_001186908; NP_065092	n/a
Location (UCSC)	Chr 3: 146.39 – 146.5 Mb	n/a
PubMed search		n/a
- Wikidata
View/Edit Human

Phospholipid scramblase 2, also known as Ca^{2+}-dependent phospholipid scramblase 2, is a protein that in humans is encoded by the PLSCR2 gene.

== See also ==
- scramblase
