= PLSCR4 =

Protein-coding gene in the species Homo sapiens

Identifiers
- Aliases: PLSCR4, TRA1, phospholipid scramblase 4
- External IDs: OMIM: 607612; MGI: 2143267; GeneCards: PLSCR4
Available structures
| PDB | Ortholog search: PDBe RCSB |
| PDB | List of PDB id codes 3Q5U |

Gene location (Human)
| Chr. | Chromosome 3 (human) |
| Band | 3q24 | Start | 146,192,335 bp |
| Band | 3q24 | End | 146,251,179 bp |

Gene location (Mouse)
| Chr. | Chromosome 9 (mouse) |
| Band | 9|9 E3.3 | Start | 92,339,426 bp |
| Band | 9|9 E3.3 | End | 92,374,509 bp |
RNA expression pattern
| Bgee | Human / Mouse (ortholog); Top expressed in: germinal epithelium; parietal pleura; Achilles tendon; tibial nerve; pericardium; visceral pleura; ascending aorta; Descending thoracic aorta; synovial joint; optic nerve / Top expressed in: sciatic nerve; iris; lumbar spinal ganglion; carotid body; lung; right kidney; left lung lobe; right lung; esophagus; ciliary body; More reference expression data |
| BioGPS | n/a |
Gene ontology
| Molecular function | SH3 domain binding; phospholipid scramblase activity; enzyme binding; calcium ion binding; CD4 receptor binding; protein binding |
| Cellular component | integral component of membrane; plasma membrane; membrane |
| Biological process | cellular response to lipopolysaccharide; plasma membrane phospholipid scrambling |
Sources:Amigo / QuickGO
Orthologs
| Databases | NCBI: entry; OMA: entry |
| Species | Human | Mouse |
| Entrez | 57088 | 235527 |
| Ensembl | ENSG00000114698 | ENSMUSG00000032377 |
| UniProt | Q9NRQ2 | P58196 |
| RefSeq (mRNA) | NM_001128304; NM_001128305; NM_001128306; NM_001177304; NM_020353 | NM_178711 |
| RefSeq (protein) | NP_001121776; NP_001121777; NP_001121778; NP_001170775; NP_065086 | NP_848826 |
| Location (UCSC) | Chr 3: 146.19 – 146.25 Mb | Chr 9: 92.34 – 92.37 Mb |
| PubMed search |
- Wikidata
| View/Edit Human | View/Edit Mouse |

Phospholipid scramblase 4, also known as Ca^{2+}-dependent phospholipid scramblase 4, is a protein that is encoded in humans by the PLSCR4 gene.

== See also ==
- Scramblase
