= TUB (gene) =

Protein-coding gene in the species Homo sapiens

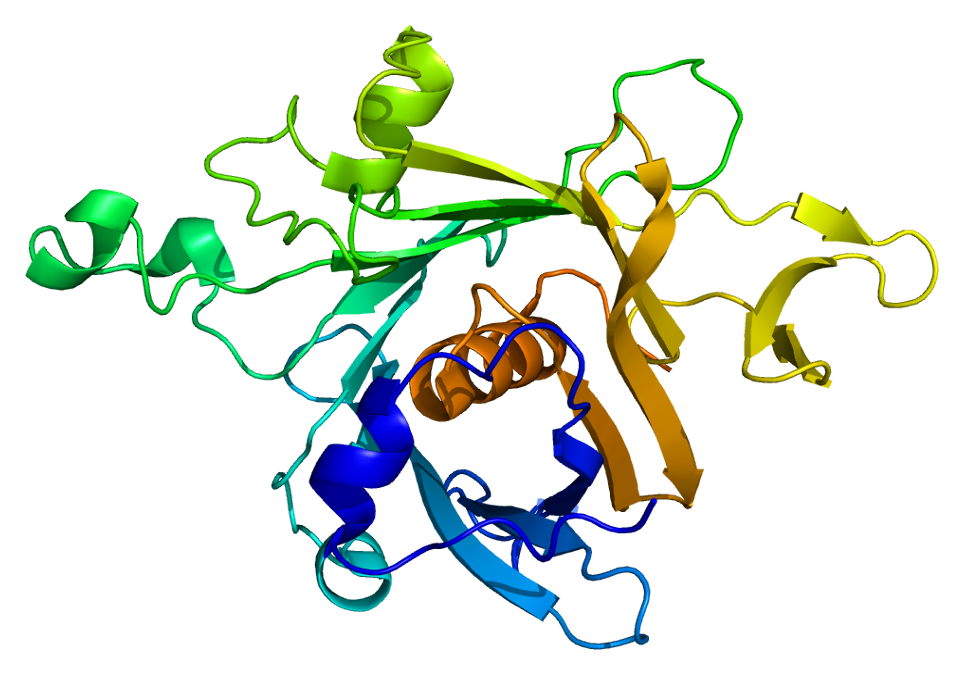
Available structures
| PDB | Ortholog search: PDBe RCSB |
| PDB | List of PDB id codes 1S31 |

Identifiers
- Aliases: TUB, rd5, RDOB, tubby bipartite transcription factor, TUB bipartite transcription factor
- External IDs: OMIM: 601197; MGI: 2651573; HomoloGene: 31147; GeneCards: TUB; OMA:TUB - orthologs

Gene location (Human)
| Chr. | Chromosome 11 (human) |
| Band | 11p15.4 | Start | 8,019,244 bp |
| Band | 11p15.4 | End | 8,106,243 bp |

Gene location (Mouse)
| Chr. | Chromosome 7 (mouse) |
| Band | 7 E3|7 57.21 cM | Start | 108,549,545 bp |
| Band | 7 E3|7 57.21 cM | End | 108,633,667 bp |
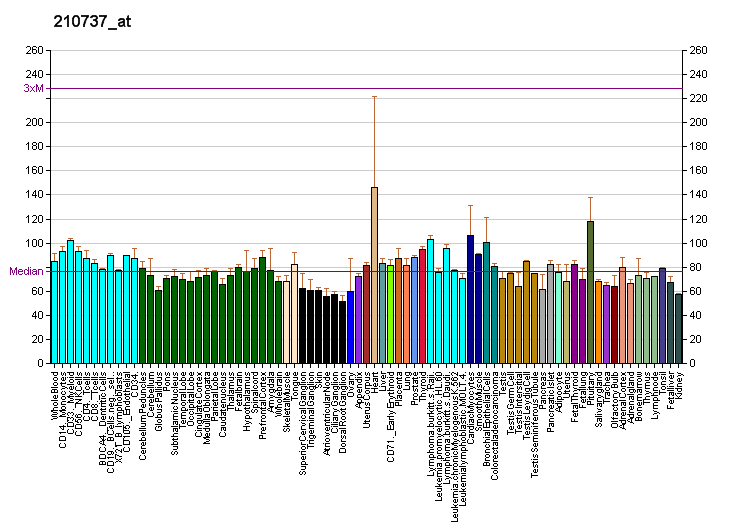

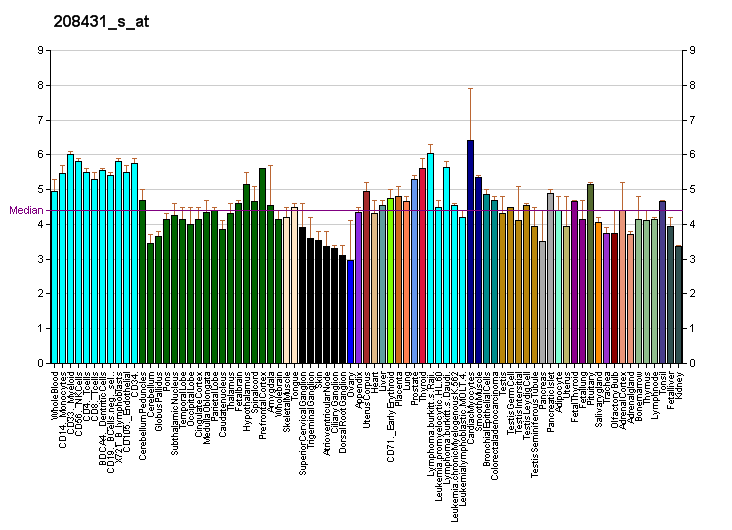
RNA expression pattern
| Bgee | Human / Mouse (ortholog); Top expressed in: pars reticulata; pars compacta; middle temporal gyrus; postcentral gyrus; entorhinal cortex; superior frontal gyrus; superior vestibular nucleus; pons; ventral tegmental area; pituitary gland / Top expressed in: neural layer of retina; dorsomedial hypothalamic nucleus; arcuate nucleus; subiculum; ventromedial nucleus; anterior amygdaloid area; paraventricular nucleus of hypothalamus; dentate gyrus of hippocampal formation granule cell; habenula; lateral hypothalamus; More reference expression data |
| BioGPS | More reference expression data |
Gene ontology
| Molecular function | phosphatidylinositol binding; protein-containing complex binding; G protein-coupled receptor binding; intraciliary transport particle A binding |
| Cellular component | cytoplasm; extracellular region; cytosol; plasma membrane; cilium; membrane; nucleus |
| Biological process | phagocytosis, recognition; receptor localization to non-motile cilium; response to hormone; positive regulation of phagocytosis; photoreceptor cell maintenance; hearing; retina development in camera-type eye; protein localization to photoreceptor outer segment; response to stimulus; phagocytosis; protein localization to cilium; regulation of G protein-coupled receptor signaling pathway; intraciliary transport |
Sources:Amigo / QuickGO
Orthologs
| Species | Human | Mouse |
| Entrez | 7275 | 22141 |
| Ensembl | ENSG00000166402 | ENSMUSG00000031028 |
| UniProt | P50607 | P50586 |
| RefSeq (mRNA) | NM_003320; NM_177972 | NM_021885 |
| RefSeq (protein) | NP_003311; NP_813977 | NP_068685 |
| Location (UCSC) | Chr 11: 8.02 – 8.11 Mb | Chr 7: 108.55 – 108.63 Mb |
| PubMed search |
- Wikidata
| View/Edit Human | View/Edit Mouse |

Tubby protein homolog is a protein that in humans is encoded by the TUB gene.

This gene encodes a member of the Tubby family of bipartite transcription factors. The encoded protein may play a role in obesity and sensorineural degradation. The crystal structure has been determined for a similar protein in mouse, and it functions as a membrane-bound transcription regulator that translocates to the nucleus in response to phosphoinositide hydrolysis. Two transcript variants encoding distinct isoforms have been identified for this gene.

== Interactions ==
TUB (gene) has been shown to interact with PLCG1.
