= NUDT21 =

Protein-coding gene in the species Homo sapiens

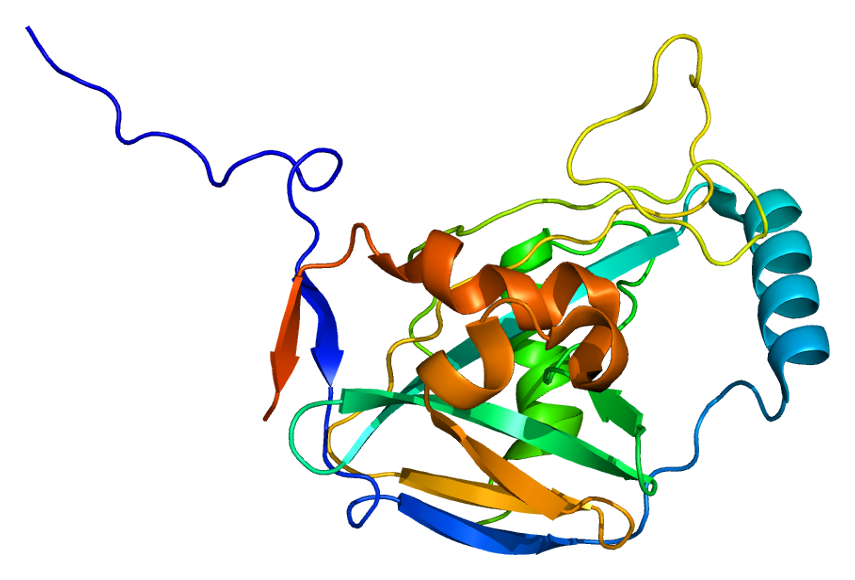

Identifiers
- Aliases: NUDT21, CFIM25, CPSF5, nudix hydrolase 21
- External IDs: OMIM: 604978; MGI: 1915469; GeneCards: NUDT21
Available structures
PDB	Ortholog search: PDBe RCSB
PDB	List of PDB id codes 2CL3, 2J8Q, 3BAP, 3BHO, 3MDG, 3MDI, 3N9U, 3P5T, 3P6Y, 3Q2S, 3Q2T

Gene location (Human)
Chr.	Chromosome 16 (human)
Band	16q13	Start	56,429,133 bp
Band	16q13	End	56,452,199 bp

Gene location (Mouse)
Chr.	Chromosome 8 (mouse)
Band	8|8 C5	Start	94,742,124 bp
Band	8|8 C5	End	94,763,659 bp
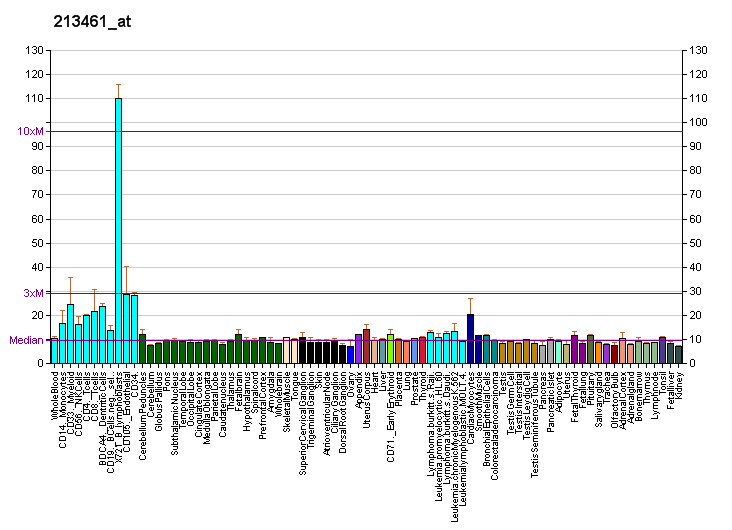

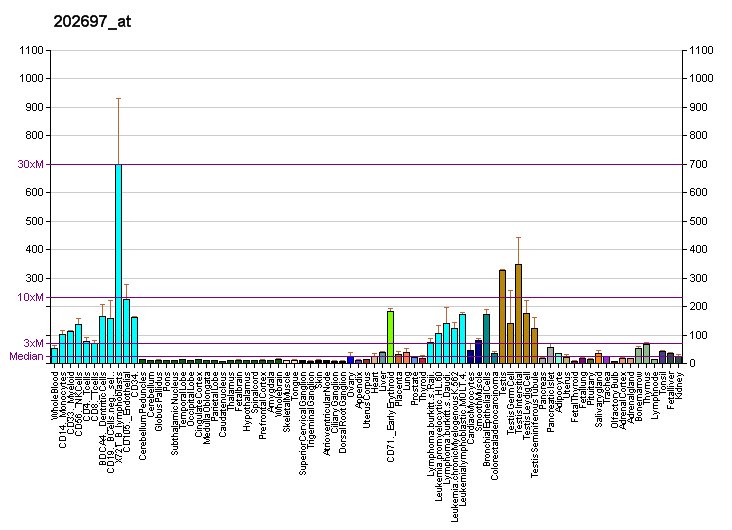
RNA expression pattern
Bgee	Human / Mouse (ortholog); Top expressed in: gonad; ganglionic eminence; ventricular zone; pons; caput epididymis; left testis; germinal epithelium; superior vestibular nucleus; Achilles tendon; right testis / Top expressed in: superior cervical ganglion; spermatocyte; ventricular zone; spermatid; embryo; yolk sac; hand; embryo; ganglionic eminence; tail of embryo; More reference expression data
BioGPS	More reference expression data
Gene ontology
Molecular function	protein homodimerization activity; histone deacetylase binding; protein binding; mRNA binding; hydrolase activity; RNA binding; identical protein binding; chromatin binding; mRNA 3'-UTR AU-rich region binding
Cellular component	paraspeckles; centrosome; nucleoplasm; microtubule organizing center; mRNA cleavage factor complex; nucleus; nuclear body; cytoplasm; mRNA cleavage and polyadenylation specificity factor complex
Biological process	mRNA splicing, via spliceosome; termination of RNA polymerase II transcription; protein tetramerization; mRNA 3'-end processing; mRNA polyadenylation; mRNA processing; posttranscriptional regulation of gene expression; cell differentiation; positive regulation of mRNA cleavage; protein heterotetramerization; pre-mRNA cleavage required for polyadenylation; mRNA alternative polyadenylation; positive regulation of mRNA polyadenylation; messenger ribonucleoprotein complex assembly; positive regulation of stem cell differentiation; positive regulation of pro-B cell differentiation
Sources:Amigo / QuickGO
Orthologs
Databases	NCBI: entry; OMA: entry
Species	Human	Mouse
Entrez	11051	68219
Ensembl	ENSG00000167005	ENSMUSG00000031754
UniProt	O43809	Q9CQF3
RefSeq (mRNA)	NM_007006	NM_026623
RefSeq (protein)	NP_008937	NP_080899
Location (UCSC)	Chr 16: 56.43 – 56.45 Mb	Chr 8: 94.74 – 94.76 Mb
PubMed search
- Wikidata
View/Edit Human	View/Edit Mouse

Cleavage and polyadenylation specificity factor subunit 5 (CPSF5) is an enzyme that in humans is encoded by the NUDT21 gene. It belongs to the Nudix family of hydrolases.

The protein encoded by this gene is one subunit of the cleavage factor Im complex required for 3' RNA cleavage and polyadenylation processing. The interaction of the protein with the RNA is one of the earliest steps in the assembly of the 3' end processing complex and facilitates the recruitment of other processing factors. This gene encodes the 25kD subunit of the protein complex, which is composed of four polypeptides.
