= CPSF6 =

Protein-coding gene in humans

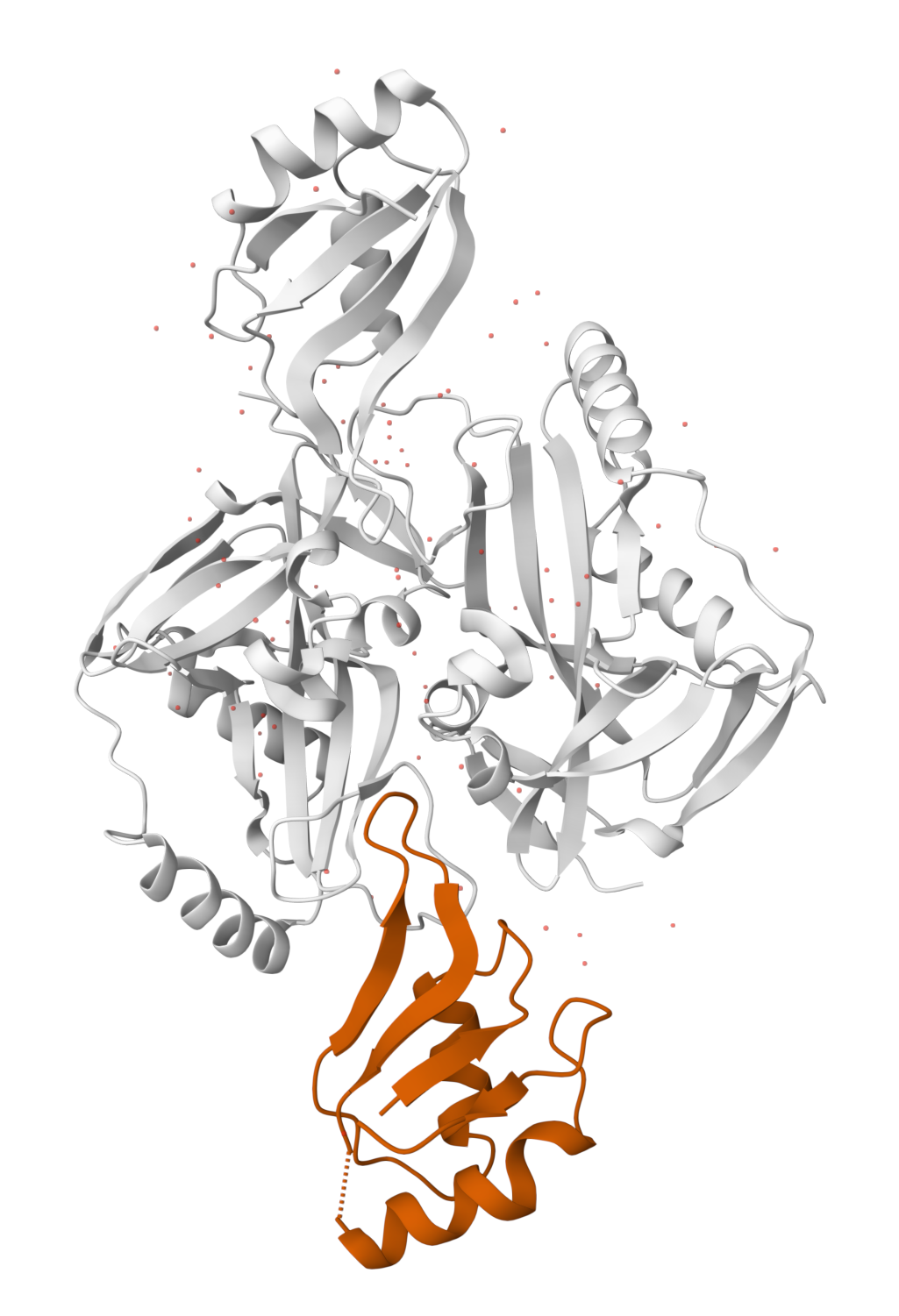

Identifiers
- Aliases: CPSF6, CFIM, CFIM68, HPBRII-4, HPBRII-7, cleavage and polyadenylation specific factor 6, CFIM72
- External IDs: OMIM: 604979; MGI: 1913948; GeneCards: CPSF6
Available structures
PDB	Ortholog search: PDBe RCSB
PDB	List of PDB id codes 3P5T, 3P6Y, 3Q2S, 3Q2T, 4B4N, 4U0A, 4U0B, 4WYM

Gene location (Human)
Chr.	Chromosome 12 (human)
Band	12q15	Start	69,239,569 bp
Band	12q15	End	69,274,358 bp

Gene location (Mouse)
Chr.	Chromosome 10 (mouse)
Band	10|10 D2	Start	117,180,578 bp
Band	10|10 D2	End	117,215,920 bp
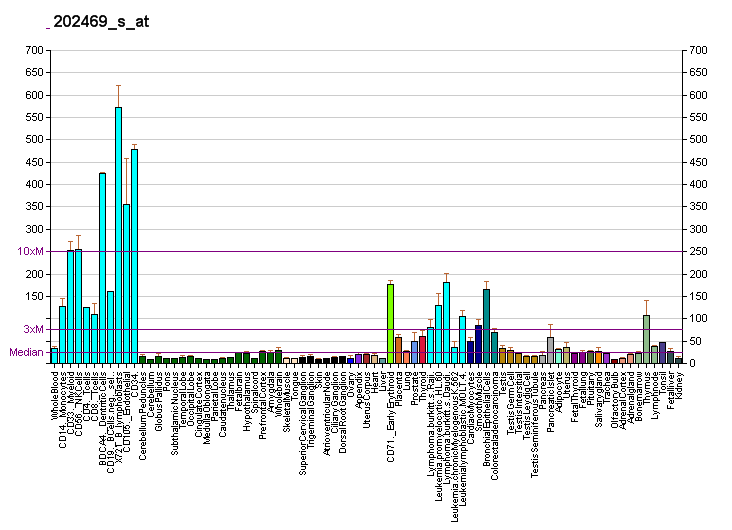

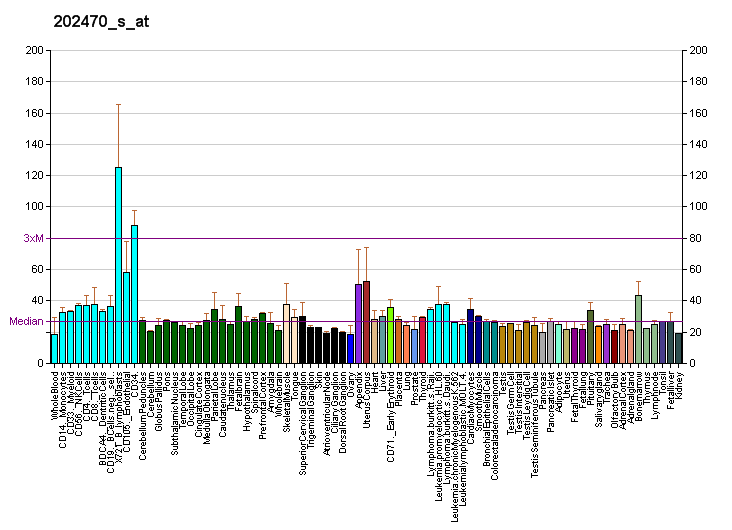
RNA expression pattern
Bgee	Human / Mouse (ortholog); Top expressed in: ganglionic eminence; bone marrow cell; Achilles tendon; ventricular zone; tonsil; left ovary; right ovary; appendix; sural nerve; endometrium / Top expressed in: superior cervical ganglion; hand; otolith organ; utricle; mandibular prominence; cumulus cell; trigeminal ganglion; maxillary prominence; abdominal wall; ganglionic eminence; More reference expression data
BioGPS	More reference expression data
Gene ontology
Molecular function	protein binding; mRNA binding; RNA binding; nucleic acid binding; ribosomal large subunit binding; exon-exon junction complex binding
Cellular component	paraspeckles; membrane; nucleus; nucleoplasm; nuclear speck; mRNA cleavage factor complex; perichromatin fibrils; cytoplasm; mRNA cleavage and polyadenylation specificity factor complex; interchromatin granule; ribonucleoprotein complex
Biological process	mRNA polyadenylation; mRNA processing; protein tetramerization; positive regulation of RNA export from nucleus; protein heterotetramerization; pre-mRNA cleavage required for polyadenylation; mRNA alternative polyadenylation; messenger ribonucleoprotein complex assembly
Sources:Amigo / QuickGO
Orthologs
Databases	NCBI: entry; OMA: entry
Species	Human	Mouse
Entrez	11052	432508
Ensembl	ENSG00000111605	ENSMUSG00000055531
UniProt	Q16630	Q6NVF9
RefSeq (mRNA)	NM_001300947; NM_007007	NM_001013391; NM_001310609
RefSeq (protein)	NP_001287876; NP_008938	NP_001013409; NP_001297538
Location (UCSC)	Chr 12: 69.24 – 69.27 Mb	Chr 10: 117.18 – 117.22 Mb
PubMed search
- Wikidata
View/Edit Human	View/Edit Mouse

Cleavage and polyadenylation specificity factor subunit 6 is a protein that in humans is encoded by the CPSF6 gene.

== Function ==
The protein encoded by this gene is one subunit of a cleavage factor required for 3' RNA cleavage and polyadenylation processing. The interaction of the protein with the RNA is one of the earliest steps in the assembly of the 3' end processing complex and facilitates the recruitment of other processing factors. The cleavage factor complex is composed of four polypeptides. This gene encodes the 68kD subunit. It has a domain organization reminiscent of spliceosomal proteins.

== Interactions ==
CPSF6 has been shown to interact with WWP1 and PLSCR1.

CPSF6 plays an important role in the nuclear import and integration of HIV-1 capsids.
