= Meier-Gorlin syndrome =

- Other names: Ear-patella-short stature syndrome, MGORS
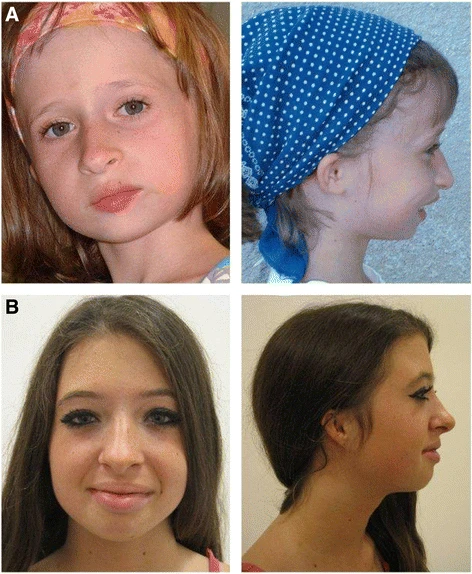
- This photo shows two persons with Meier-Gorlin syndrome, who have typical facial features of this syndrome, such as hooked nose, microtia, retro-/micrognathia, a small mouth with full lips.
- Symptoms: IUGR, short stature, patellar hypoplasia or aplasia, microtia, micromastia, pulmonary emphysema.
- Types: 8
- Causes: Mutations in the genes ORC1, ORC4, ORC6, CDT1, CDC6, CDC45L, MCM5, GMNN, GINS3, DONSON.
- Treatment: Symptomatic
- Frequency: 1-9:1 000 000

Meier-Gorlin syndrome, also known as ear-patella-short stature syndrome, is a rare autosomal recessive genetic disorder, which is mainly characterized by pre- and postnatal growth deficiency, patellar aplasia or hypoplasia, and underdevelopment of both ears. Patients have characteristic facial signs, such as small mouth with full lips, receding jaw, hooked nose, and small ears with abnormal shape. Meier-Gorlin syndrome is considered to be one of the forms of microcephalic primordial dwarfism.

Fewer than 150 cases had been recorded as of 2024.

== Symptoms ==
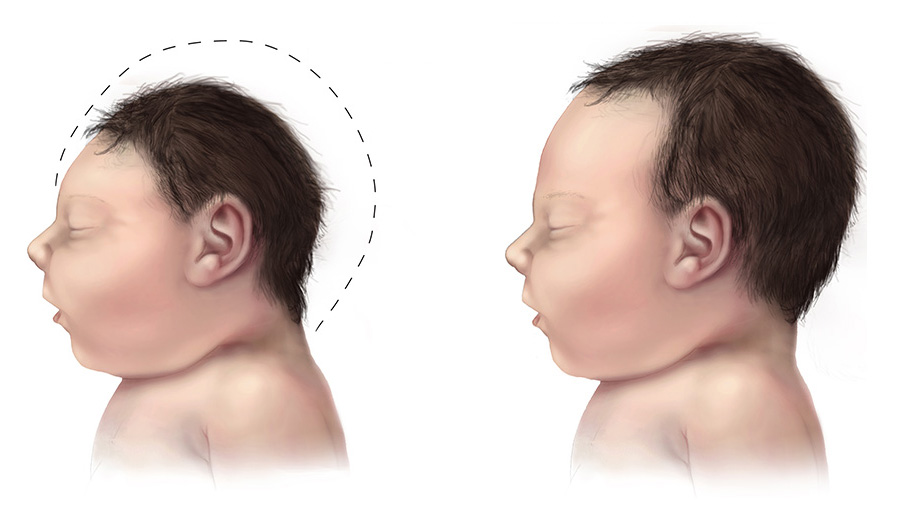
Side-view illustration of a baby with microcephaly (left) compared to a baby with a normal head size

The classic triad of this disorder consist of pre- and postnatal growth deficiency, patellar aplasia or hypoplasia, and underdevelopment of both ears.

Patellar and microtia are present in almost all patients, the severity of microtia can range from mild to severe, and ears can appear underdeveloped and low-set. Also, microtia can be accompanied by stenosis of the external auditory canal and conduction deafness, and patellas are absent in most patients, but in some cases, patellas might be hypoplastic. Most of the patients had IUGR (Intrauterine growth restriction) and consequently had delayed growth after birth, and growth velocity was nearly normal after. Another most common feature is microcephaly.

Most of the patients have normal intellectual functioning; some of the patients had developmental delays without intellectual disability; only one had mild intellectual disabilities.

Female patients usually experience underdevelopment of breast tissue, and some patients have abnormal genitalia (such as hypoplastic labia minora or majora, or cryptorchidism). Also, the development of secondary sex characteristics was affected in some patients (lack of underarm or pubic hair). Pulmonary emphysema can also be seen in some cases.

Craniosynostosis is mainly associated with CDC45L (MGORS7) mutations.

== Diagnosis ==
MGORS can be suspected by having one of the classic signs (such as microtia) and it can be confirmed by genetic testing.

== Cause ==
MGORS is a heterogenous disorder (which means that different gene mutations cause the same disorder), and MGS can be caused by mutation in these genes:

Type	Gene	OMIM	Inheritance
MGORS1	ORC1	224690	Autosomal recessive
MGORS2	ORC4	613800	Autosomal recessive
MGORS3	ORC6	613803	Autosomal recessive
MGORS4	CDT1	613804	Autosomal recessive
MGORS5	CDC6	613805	Autosomal recessive
MGORS6	GMNN	616835	Autosomal dominant
MGORS7	CDC45L	617063	Autosomal recessive
MGORS8	MCM5	617564	Autosomal recessive
MGORS9	GINS3	621512	Autosomal recessive
MGORS10	DONSON	621528	Autosomal recessive

Note: MGORS6 is an autosomal dominant form of MGORS.

== Pathophysiology ==
Pre-replication complex is an important protein complex, which consist of 6 subunits of Origin Recognition Complex (ORC1, ORC2, ORC3, ORC4, ORC5 and ORC6 genes), CDC6, CDT1, and MCM2-7 (MCM2, MCM3, MCM4, MCM5, MCM6, MCM7). This complex is loaded on so called origins of replication in early M phase into G1 phase, which is important for the cell cycle CDC45L is also part of the pre-replication complex and CMG helicase complex, which is important for the beginning of DNA replication.

In case of MGORS, these proteins usually lose their function, which impairs the rate of the cell cycle and causes growth restriction. GMNN mutations are autosomal dominant gain-of-function mutations, which cause hyperactivation of the protein, and it inhibits replication much longer through CDT1 destruction.

According to one study, some proteins (which mutations are linked to MGORS) have non-canonical function, such as ORC6 stimulates separation of two daughter cells during cytokinesis and it also participates in MMR during DNA replication. Also, CDT1 stabilizes kinetochore-microtubule interactions during M phase. ORC1 regulates centrosome and centriole replication through two separate domain interaction.

== Treatment ==
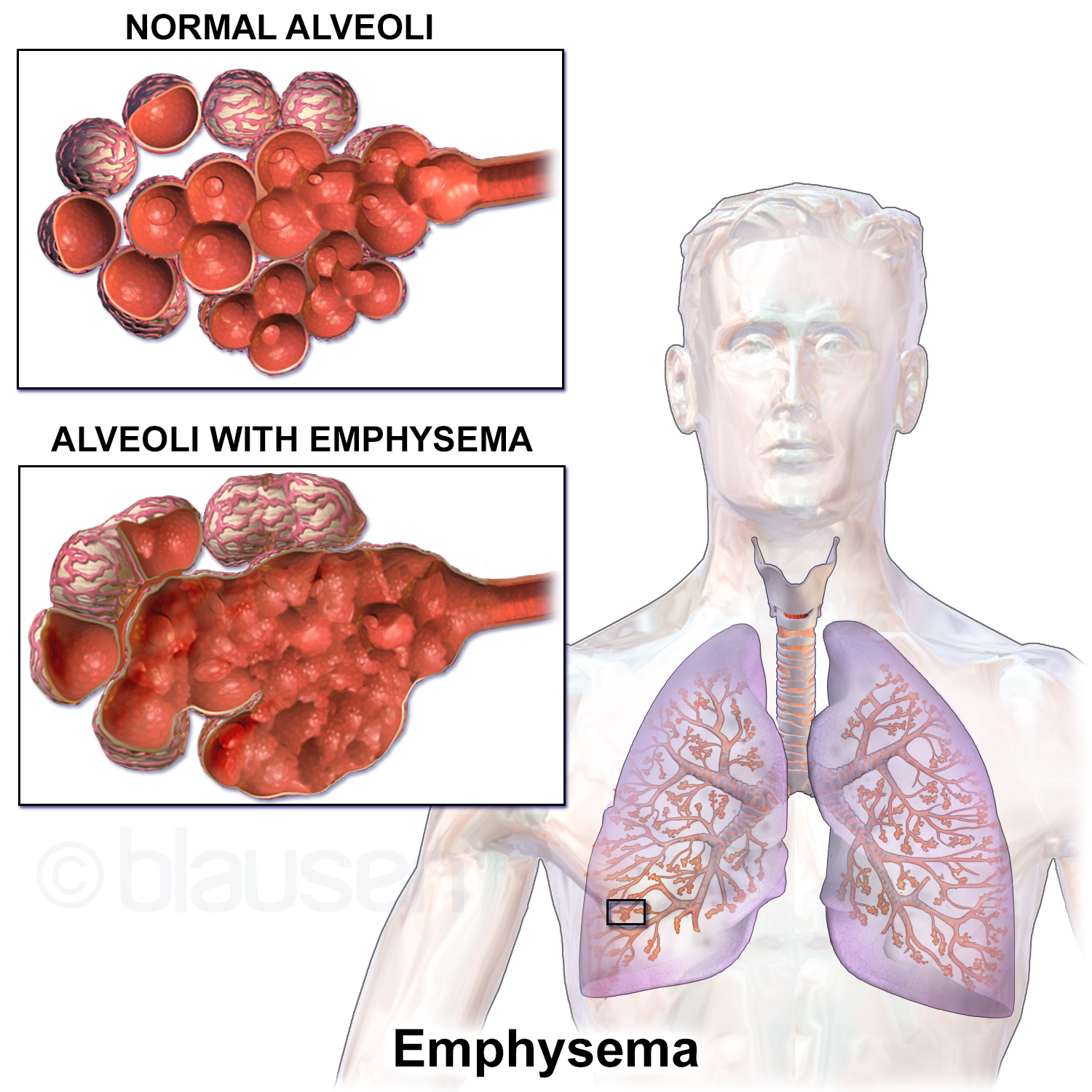
This illustration shows normal alveoli and alveoli with emphysema.

Although Meier-Gorlin syndrome has no cure, it can be managed. Mainly management is focused on growth retardation, hearing loss, floating kneecap, feeding issues, gonarthrosis, pain in the knee, and pulmonary problems due to congenital pulmonary emphysema with or without bronchomalacia or laryngomalacia.

Growth hormone therapy had been tried, although it was effective only in some cases.

== History ==
MGORS was first described by Meier and colleagues in 1959, and later by Gorlin and colleagues in 1975.
