= ORC6 =

Protein-coding gene in the species Homo sapiens

Available structures
PDB	Ortholog search: PDBe RCSB
PDB	List of PDB id codes 3M03

Identifiers
- Aliases: ORC6, ORC6L, origin recognition complex subunit 6
- External IDs: OMIM: 607213; MGI: 1929285; HomoloGene: 8635; GeneCards: ORC6; OMA:ORC6 - orthologs

Gene location (Human)
Chr.	Chromosome 16 (human)
Band	16q11.2	Start	46,689,643 bp
Band	16q11.2	End	46,698,394 bp

Gene location (Mouse)
Chr.	Chromosome 8 (mouse)
Band	8|8 C3	Start	86,026,261 bp
Band	8|8 C3	End	86,034,907 bp
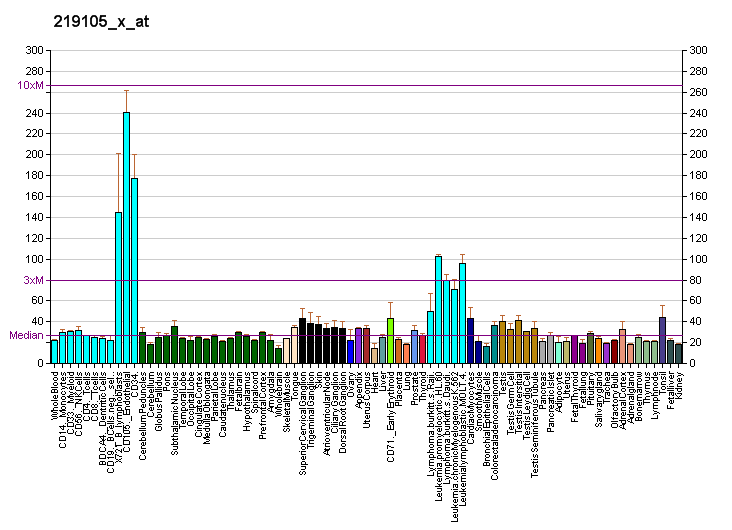
RNA expression pattern
Bgee	Human / Mouse (ortholog); Top expressed in: oocyte; endothelial cell; secondary oocyte; epithelium of colon; right testis; ventricular zone; left testis; gonad; embryo; testicle / Top expressed in: zygote; genital tubercle; secondary oocyte; tail of embryo; epiblast; mandibular prominence; otic placode; maxillary prominence; primary oocyte; embryo; More reference expression data
BioGPS	More reference expression data
Gene ontology
Molecular function	DNA binding; protein binding; DNA replication origin binding
Cellular component	nucleus; membrane; nucleoplasm; origin recognition complex; fibrillar center; nuclear origin of replication recognition complex
Biological process	G1 phase; DNA replication; DNA replication initiation; negative regulation of cell division; G1/S transition of mitotic cell cycle
Sources:Amigo / QuickGO
Orthologs
Species	Human	Mouse
Entrez	23594	56452
Ensembl	ENSG00000091651	ENSMUSG00000031697
UniProt	Q9Y5N6	Q9WUJ8
RefSeq (mRNA)	NM_014321	NM_001163791; NM_019716
RefSeq (protein)	NP_055136	n/a
Location (UCSC)	Chr 16: 46.69 – 46.7 Mb	Chr 8: 86.03 – 86.03 Mb
PubMed search
- Wikidata
View/Edit Human	View/Edit Mouse

Origin recognition complex subunit 6 (ORC6)

Identifiers
- Symbol: ORC6
- Pfam: PF05460
- InterPro: IPR008721
Available protein structures:
- Pfam: structures / ECOD
- PDB: RCSB PDB; PDBe; PDBj
- PDBsum: structure summary

Origin recognition complex subunit 6 is a protein that in humans is encoded by the ORC6 (ORC6L) gene.

== Background ==
The origin recognition complex (ORC) is a highly conserved six subunit protein complex essential for the initiation of the DNA replication in eukaryotic cells. Studies in yeast demonstrated that ORC binds specifically to origins of replication and serves as a platform for the assembly of additional initiation factors such as Cdc6 and Mcm proteins.

== Function ==
The protein encoded by this gene is a subunit of the ORC complex. It has been shown that this protein and ORC1 are loosely associated with the core complex consisting of ORC2, -3, -4 and -5. Gene silencing studies with small interfering RNA demonstrated that this protein plays an essential role in coordinating chromosome replication and segregation with cytokinesis.

== Interactions ==
ORC6 has been shown to interact with MCM5, ORC2, Replication protein A1, ORC4, DBF4, ORC3, CDC45-related protein, MCM4 and Cell division cycle 7-related protein kinase.
