= Origin recognition complex =

Origin recognition complex subunit 2

Identifiers
- Symbol: ORC2
- Pfam: PF04084
- InterPro: IPR007220
Available protein structures:
- PDB: IPR007220 PF04084 (ECOD; PDBsum)
- AlphaFold: IPR007220; PF04084

Origin recognition complex (ORC) subunit 3 N-terminus

Identifiers
- Symbol: ORC3_N
- Pfam: PF07034
- InterPro: IPR010748
Available protein structures:
- PDB: IPR010748 PF07034 (ECOD; PDBsum)
- AlphaFold: IPR010748; PF07034

Origin recognition complex subunit 6 (ORC6)

Identifiers
- Symbol: ORC6
- Pfam: PF05460
- InterPro: IPR008721
Available protein structures:
- PDB: IPR008721 PF05460 (ECOD; PDBsum)
- AlphaFold: IPR008721; PF05460

In molecular biology, origin recognition complex (ORC) is a multi-subunit DNA binding complex (6 subunits) that binds in all eukaryotes and archaea in an ATP-dependent manner to origins of replication. The subunits of this complex are encoded by the ORC1, ORC2, ORC3, ORC4, ORC5 and ORC6 genes. ORC is a central component for eukaryotic DNA replication, and remains bound to chromatin at replication origins throughout the cell cycle.

ORC directs DNA replication throughout the genome and is required for its initiation. ORC and Noc3p bound at replication origins serve as the foundation for assembly of the pre-replication complex (pre-RC), which includes Cdc6, Tah11 (a.k.a. Cdt1), and the Mcm2-Mcm7 complex. Pre-RC assembly during G1 is required for replication licensing of chromosomes prior to DNA synthesis during S phase. Cell cycle-regulated phosphorylation of Orc2, Orc6, Cdc6, and MCM by the cyclin-dependent protein kinase Cdc28 regulates initiation of DNA replication, including blocking reinitiation in G2/M phase.

The ORC is present throughout the cell cycle bound to replication origins, but is only active in late mitosis and early G1.

In yeast, ORC also plays a role in the establishment of silencing at the mating-type loci Hidden MAT Left (HML) and Hidden MAT Right (HMR). ORC participates in the assembly of transcriptionally silent chromatin at HML and HMR by recruiting the Sir1 silencing protein to the HML and HMR silencers.

Both Orc1 and Orc5 bind ATP, though only Orc1 has ATPase activity. The binding of ATP by Orc1 is required for ORC binding to DNA and is essential for cell viability. The ATPase activity of Orc1 is involved in formation of the pre-RC. ATP binding by Orc5 is crucial for the stability of ORC as a whole. Only the Orc1-5 subunits are required for origin binding; Orc6 is essential for maintenance of pre-RCs once formed. Interactions within ORC suggest that Orc2-3-6 may form a core complex. A 2020 report suggests that budding yeast ORC dimerizes in a cell cycle dependent manner to control licensing.

== Proteins ==
This process was initiated by the loading of Mcm2-7 onto the chromatid by the ORC and associated proteins

The following proteins are present in the ORC:

ORC Protein Subunits, orthology and nomenclature by species
S. cerevisiae	S. pombe	D. melanogaster	Vertebrates
ORC 1-6	ORC 1-6	ORC 1-6	ORC 1-6
Cdc6	Cdc18	Cdc6	Cdc6
Cdt1/Tah11/Sid2	Cdt1	DUP	Cdt1/RLF-B
Mcm2	Mcm2/Cdc19/Nda1	Mcm2	Mcm2
Mcm3	Mcm3	Mcm3	Mcm3
Cdc54/Mcm4	Cdc21	DPA	Mcm4
Cdc46/Mcm5	Mcm5/Nda4	Mcm5	Mcm5
Mcm6	Mcm6/Mis5	Mcm6	Mcm6
Cdc47/Mcm7	Mcm7	Mcm7	mcm7

Archaea feature a simplified version of the ORC, Mcm, and as a consequence the combined pre-RC. Instead of using six different mcm proteins to form a pseudo-symmetrical heterohexamer, all six subunits in the archaeal MCM are the same. They usually have multiple proteins that are homologous to both Cdc6 and Orc1, some of which perform the function of both. Unlike eukaryotic Orc, they do not always form a complex. In fact, they have divergent complex structures when these do form. Sulfolobus islandicus also uses a Cdt1 homologue to recognize one of its replication origins.

== Autonomously replicating sequences ==
=== Budding yeast ===
Autonomously Replicating Sequences (ARS), first discovered in budding yeast, are integral to the success of the ORC. These 100-200bp sequences facilitate replication activity during S phase. ARSs can be placed at any novel location of the chromosomes of budding yeast and will facilitate replication from those sites. A highly conserved sequence of 11bp (known as the A element) is thought to be essential for origin function in budding yeast. The ORC was originally identified by its ability to bind to the A element of the ARS in budding yeast.

=== Animals ===
Animal cells contain a much more cryptic version of an ARS, with no conserved sequences found as of yet. Here, replication origins gather into bundles called replicon clusters. Each cluster's replicons are similar in length, but individual clusters have replicons of varying length. These replicons all have similar basic residues to which the ORC binds, which in many ways mimic the conserved 11bp A element. All of these clusters are simultaneously activated during S phase.

== Role in pre-RC assembly ==
The ORC is essential for the loading of MCM complexes (Pre-RC) onto DNA. This process is dependent on the ORC, Noc3, Cdc6, and Cdt1 – involving several ATP controlled recruiting events. First, the ORC, Noc3p and Cdc6 form a complex on origin DNA (marked by ARS type regions). New ORC/Noc3/Cdc6 complexes then recruit Cdt1/Mcm2-7 molecules to the site. Once this massive ORC/Noc3/Cdc6/Cdt1/Mcm2-7 complex is formed, the ORC/Noc3/Cdc6/Cdt1 molecules work together to load Mcm2-7 onto the DNA itself by hydrolysis of ATP by Cdc6. Cdc6's phosphorylative activity is dependent on both the ORC and origin DNA. This leads to Cdt1 having decreased stability on the DNA and falling off of the complex leading to Mcm2-7 loading on to the DNA. The structure of the ORC, MCM, as well as the intermediate OCCM complex has been resolved.

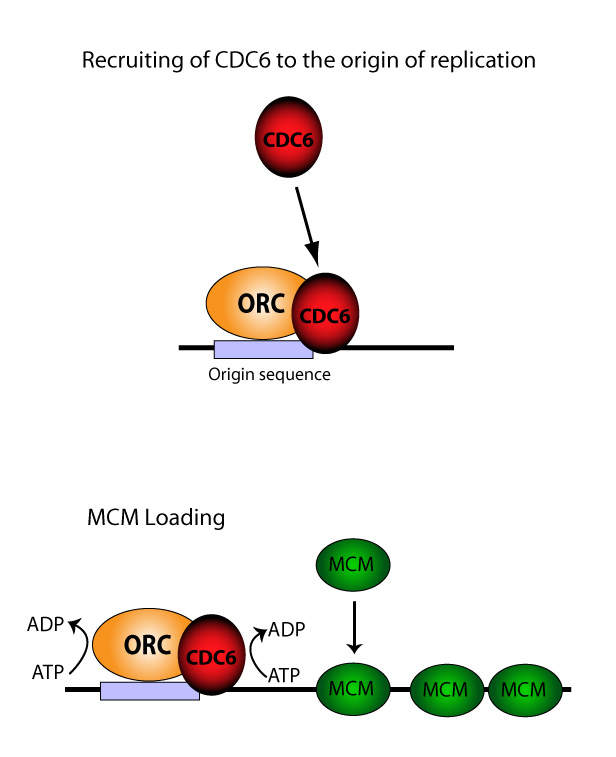
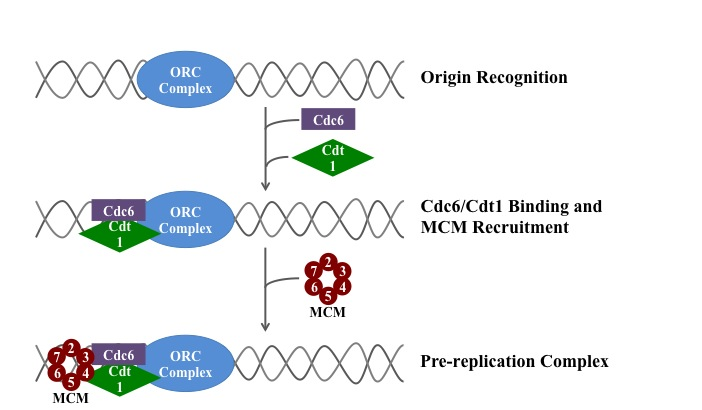

== Origin binding activity ==
Although the ORC is composed of six discrete subunits, only one of these has been found to be significant - ORC1. In vivo studies have shown that Lys-263 and Arg-367 are the basic residues responsible for faithful ORC loading. These molecules represent the above-mentioned ARS. ORC1 interacts with ATP and these basic residues in order to bind the ORC to origin DNA. It has been established that this occurs far before replication, and that the ORC itself is already bound to Origin DNA by the time any Mcm2-7 loading occurs. When Mcm2-7 is first loaded it completely encircles the DNA and helicase activity is inhibited. In S phase, the Mcm2-7 complex interacts with helicase cofactors Cdc45 and GINS to isolate a single DNA strand, unwind the origin, and begin replication down the chromosome. In order to have bidirectional replication, this process happens twice at an origin. Both loading events are mediated by one ORC via an identical process as the first.

== See also ==
- Cyclin dependant kinases (CDK)
- Cyclins
- DNA helicase
- DnaA
- Pre-replication complex
