= DBF4 =

Protein-coding gene in the species Homo sapiens

Identifiers
- Aliases: DBF4, ASK, CHIF, DBF4A, ZDBF1, DBF4 zinc finger
- External IDs: OMIM: 604281; MGI: 1351328; GeneCards: DBF4
Available structures
PDB	Ortholog search: PDBe RCSB
PDB	List of PDB id codes 4F99, 4F9A, 4F9B, 4F9C

Gene location (Human)
Chr.	Chromosome 7 (human)
Band	7q21.12	Start	87,876,216 bp
Band	7q21.12	End	87,909,553 bp

Gene location (Mouse)
Chr.	Chromosome 5 (mouse)
Band	5|5 A1	Start	8,446,973 bp
Band	5|5 A1	End	8,472,716 bp
RNA expression pattern
Bgee	Human / Mouse (ortholog); Top expressed in: testicle; gonad; ventricular zone; left testis; right testis; secondary oocyte; ganglionic eminence; bone marrow; sperm; bone marrow cell / Top expressed in: abdominal wall; tail of embryo; primitive streak; mandibular prominence; maxillary prominence; endothelial cell of lymphatic vessel; genital tubercle; primary oocyte; dermis; spermatocyte; More reference expression data
BioGPS	n/a
Gene ontology
Molecular function	zinc ion binding; enzyme activator activity; metal ion binding; nucleic acid binding; protein binding; protein kinase binding; protein serine/threonine kinase activator activity
Cellular component	nucleoplasm; nucleus; nuclear body; Dbf4-dependent protein kinase complex
Biological process	DNA replication; cell cycle; positive regulation of catalytic activity; G1/S transition of mitotic cell cycle; positive regulation of DNA replication; positive regulation of protein serine/threonine kinase activity; positive regulation of nuclear cell cycle DNA replication; regulation of cell cycle phase transition
Sources:Amigo / QuickGO
Orthologs
Databases	NCBI: entry; OMA: entry
Species	Human	Mouse
Entrez	10926	27214
Ensembl	ENSG00000006634	ENSMUSG00000002297
UniProt	Q9UBU7	Q9QZ41
RefSeq (mRNA)	NM_006716; NM_001318060; NM_001318061; NM_001318062	NM_001190717; NM_013726
RefSeq (protein)	NP_001304989; NP_001304990; NP_001304991; NP_006707	NP_001177646; NP_038754
Location (UCSC)	Chr 7: 87.88 – 87.91 Mb	Chr 5: 8.45 – 8.47 Mb
PubMed search
- Wikidata
View/Edit Human	View/Edit Mouse

Protein DBF4 homolog A is a protein that is encoded by the DBF4 gene in humans.

== Interactions ==
DBF4 has been shown to interact with:

- Cell division cycle 7-related protein kinase,
- MCM3,
- MCM7,
- ORC2L, and
- ORC6L.
