= ORC2 =

Protein-coding gene in the species Homo sapiens

Available structures
PDB	Ortholog search: PDBe RCSB
PDB	List of PDB id codes 5C8H

Identifiers
- Aliases: ORC2, ORC2L, origin recognition complex subunit 2
- External IDs: OMIM: 601182; MGI: 1328306; HomoloGene: 4512; GeneCards: ORC2; OMA:ORC2 - orthologs

Gene location (Human)
Chr.	Chromosome 2 (human)
Band	2q33.1	Start	200,908,977 bp
Band	2q33.1	End	200,963,680 bp

Gene location (Mouse)
Chr.	Chromosome 1 (mouse)
Band	1|1 C1.3	Start	58,501,930 bp
Band	1|1 C1.3	End	58,544,268 bp
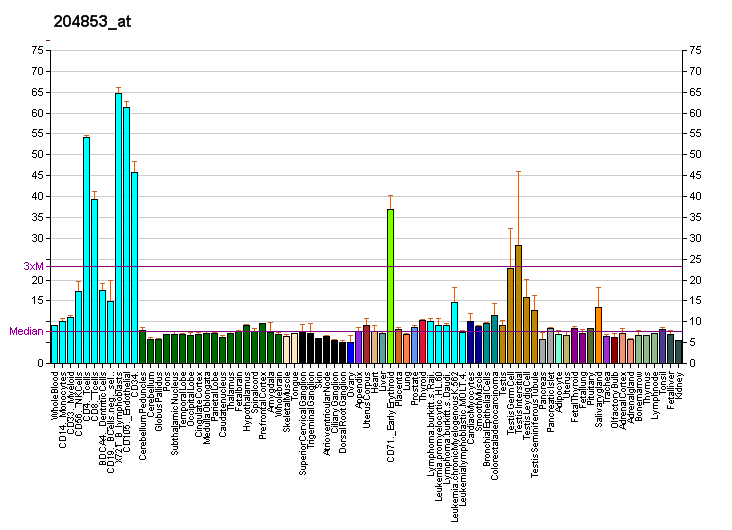
RNA expression pattern
Bgee	Human / Mouse (ortholog); Top expressed in: Achilles tendon; sural nerve; epithelium of colon; buccal mucosa cell; gastric mucosa; body of pancreas; secondary oocyte; skin of leg; right testis; left testis / Top expressed in: spermatocyte; fetal liver hematopoietic progenitor cell; tail of embryo; medullary collecting duct; ventricular zone; epiblast; spermatid; genital tubercle; Paneth cell; primitive streak; More reference expression data
BioGPS	More reference expression data
Gene ontology
Molecular function	protein binding; DNA replication origin binding
Cellular component	heterochromatin; inner kinetochore; nuclear origin of replication recognition complex; centrosome; chromatin; origin recognition complex; membrane; nucleoplasm; nucleus
Biological process	G1 phase; DNA replication; negative regulation of transcription by RNA polymerase II; DNA replication initiation; G1/S transition of mitotic cell cycle
Sources:Amigo / QuickGO
Orthologs
Species	Human	Mouse
Entrez	4999	18393
Ensembl	ENSG00000115942	ENSMUSG00000026037
UniProt	Q13416	Q60862
RefSeq (mRNA)	NM_006190	NM_001025378; NM_001271526; NM_008765
RefSeq (protein)	NP_006181	NP_001020549; NP_001258455; NP_032791
Location (UCSC)	Chr 2: 200.91 – 200.96 Mb	Chr 1: 58.5 – 58.54 Mb
PubMed search
- Wikidata
View/Edit Human	View/Edit Mouse

Origin recognition complex subunit 2

Identifiers
- Symbol: ORC2
- Pfam: PF04084
- InterPro: IPR007220
Available protein structures:
- Pfam: structures / ECOD
- PDB: RCSB PDB; PDBe; PDBj
- PDBsum: structure summary

Origin recognition complex subunit 2 is a protein that is encoded by the ORC2 (ORC2L) gene in humans.

== Function ==
The origin recognition complex (ORC) is a highly conserved six subunits protein complex essential for the initiation of the DNA replication in eukaryotic cells. Studies in yeast demonstrated that ORC binds specifically to origins of replication and serves as a platform for the assembly of additional initiation factors such as Cdc6 and Mcm proteins. The protein encoded by this gene is a subunit of the ORC complex. This protein forms a core complex with ORC3, ORC4, and ORC5. It also interacts with CDC45L and MCM10, which are proteins known to be important for the initiation of DNA replication. This protein has been demonstrated to specifically associate with the origin of replication of Epstein-Barr virus in human cells, and is thought to be required for DNA replication from viral origin of replication.

== Interactions ==
ORC2 has been shown to interact with:

- CDC6,
- DBF4,
- MCM10,
- MCM2
- MCM4,
- MCM5,
- MCM6,
- MCM7,
- ORC1,
- ORC3,
- ORC4,
- ORC5,
- ORC6, and
- Replication protein A1.
