= MCM4 =

Protein-coding gene in humans

Identifiers
- Aliases: MCM4, CDC21, CDC54, NKCD, NKGCD, P1-CDC21, hCdc21, minichromosome maintenance complex component 4, IMD54
- External IDs: OMIM: 602638; MGI: 103199; GeneCards: MCM4
Enzyme activity
EC #	BRENDA	ExPASy	KEGG	MetaCyc
3.6.4.12	↗	↗	↗	↗

Gene location (Mouse)
Chr.	Chromosome 16 (mouse)
Band	16 A2|16 10.09 cM	Start	15,441,761 bp
Band	16 A2|16 10.09 cM	End	15,455,264 bp
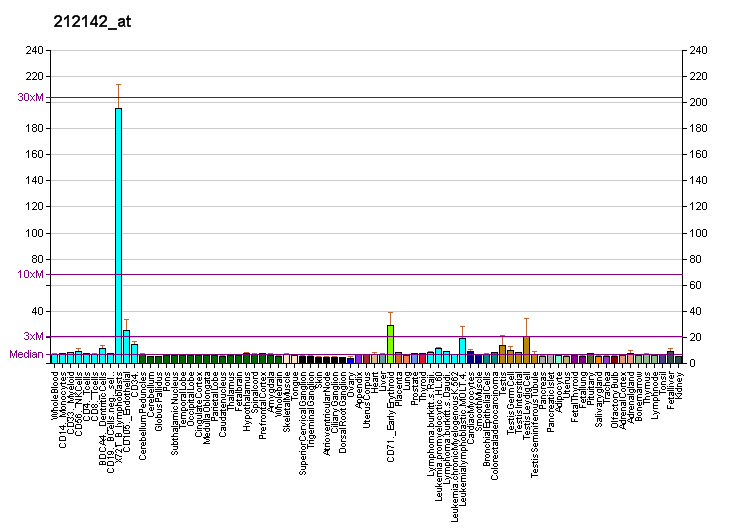

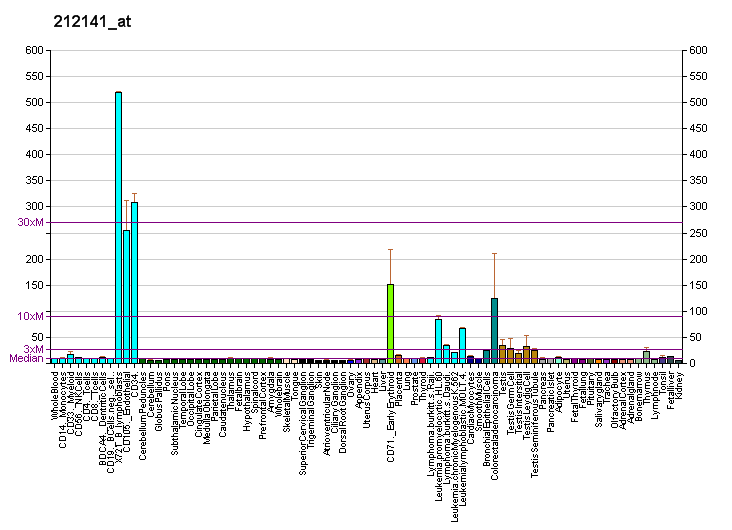

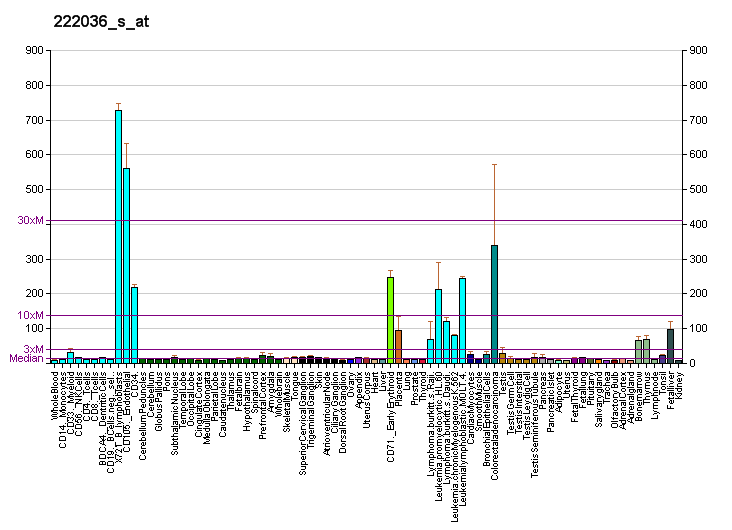
RNA expression pattern
Bgee	Human / Mouse (ortholog); Top expressed in: ganglionic eminence; bone marrow cell; human penis; stromal cell of endometrium; oocyte; appendix; trabecular bone; rectum; sperm; skin of abdomen / Top expressed in: mandibular prominence; maxillary prominence; primitive streak; somite; external carotid artery; Paneth cell; abdominal wall; internal carotid artery; epiblast; ureter; More reference expression data
BioGPS	More reference expression data
Gene ontology
Molecular function	single-stranded DNA binding; nucleotide binding; DNA helicase activity; DNA binding; protein binding; hydrolase activity; ATP binding; helicase activity; DNA replication origin binding
Cellular component	MCM complex; membrane; nucleus; nucleoplasm
Biological process	G1 phase; DNA replication; cell cycle; DNA replication initiation; DNA unwinding involved in DNA replication; G1/S transition of mitotic cell cycle; double-strand break repair via break-induced replication; pre-replicative complex assembly involved in nuclear cell cycle DNA replication; DNA strand elongation involved in DNA replication; mitotic DNA replication initiation
Sources:Amigo / QuickGO
Orthologs
Databases	NCBI: entry
Species	Human	Mouse
Entrez	4173	17217
Ensembl	n/a	ENSMUSG00000022673
UniProt	P33991	P49717
RefSeq (mRNA)	NM_005914; NM_182746	NM_008565
RefSeq (protein)	NP_005905; NP_877423	NP_032591
Location (UCSC)	n/a	Chr 16: 15.44 – 15.46 Mb
PubMed search
- Wikidata
View/Edit Human	View/Edit Mouse

DNA replication licensing factor MCM4 is a protein that in humans is encoded by the MCM4 gene.

== Function ==
The protein encoded by this gene is one of the highly conserved mini-chromosome maintenance proteins (MCM) that are essential for the initiation of eukaryotic genome replication. The hexameric protein complex formed by MCM proteins is a key component of the pre-replication complex (pre-RC) and may be involved in the formation of replication forks and in the recruitment of other DNA replication related proteins. The MCM complex consisting of this protein and MCM2, 6 and 7 proteins possesses DNA helicase activity, and may act as a DNA unwinding enzyme. The phosphorylation of this protein by CDC2 kinase reduces the DNA helicase activity and chromatin binding of the MCM complex. This gene is mapped to a region on the chromosome 8 head-to-head next to the PRKDC/DNA-PK, a DNA-activated protein kinase involved in the repair of DNA double-strand breaks. Alternatively spliced transcript variants encoding the same protein have been reported.

== See also ==
- Mini Chromosome Maintenance

== Interactions ==
MCM4 has been shown to interact with:

- Cell division cycle 7-related protein kinase,
- MCM2,
- MCM6,
- MCM7,
- ORC1L,
- ORC2L,
- ORC3L,
- ORC4L,
- ORC5L,
- ORC6L, and
- Replication protein A1.
