= OriDB =

Content
- Description: DNA replication origin database.
- Organisms: Saccharomyces cerevisiae, Schizosaccharomyces pombe

Contact
- Laboratory: Nieduszynski lab.
- Primary citation: Siow al. (2012)
- Release date: 2006, 2012

Access
- Website: https://cerevisiae.oridb.org, https://pombe.oridb.org

Miscellaneous
- License: Free

OriDB is a biological database of confirmed and predicted DNA replication origin sites in the model organisms Saccharomyces cerevisiae and Schizosaccharomyces pombe.

The DNA Replication Origin Database (OriDB) provides access to collated published datasets that have predicted and/or confirmed the location of replication origins. Each potential replication origin site is listed as confirmed, likely or dubious dependent upon the level of supporting data. For each site addition information is available, including:

- the genomic location of the origin site;
- the DNA sequence;
- a graphic view of the origin site that includes experimental data;
- the published studies that proposed the origin;
- links to appropriate original studies.

In addition, there is a graphic viewer that allows users to select chromosomal regions and display selected datasets. All original datasets presented in OriDB are available for download.

== See also ==
- Origin of replication
