= MCM6 =

Identifiers
- Aliases: MCM6, MCG40308, Mis5, P105MCM, minichromosome maintenance complex component 6
- External IDs: OMIM: 601806; MGI: 1298227; GeneCards: MCM6
Available structures
PDB	Ortholog search: PDBe RCSB
PDB	List of PDB id codes 2KLQ, 2LE8
Enzyme activity
EC #	BRENDA	ExPASy	KEGG	MetaCyc
3.6.4.12	↗	↗	↗	↗

Gene location (Human)
Chr.	Chromosome 2 (human)
Band	2q21.3	Start	135,839,626 bp
Band	2q21.3	End	135,876,443 bp

Gene location (Mouse)
Chr.	Chromosome 1 (mouse)
Band	1 E3|1 55.8 cM	Start	128,259,327 bp
Band	1 E3|1 55.8 cM	End	128,287,401 bp
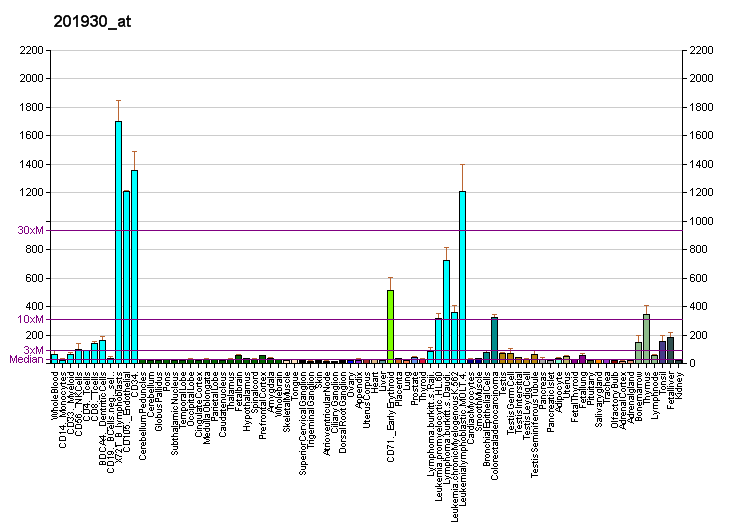
RNA expression pattern
Bgee	Human / Mouse (ortholog); Top expressed in: ventricular zone; embryo; ganglionic eminence; trabecular bone; endothelial cell; gonad; glomerulus; secondary oocyte; metanephric glomerulus; bone marrow / Top expressed in: somite; Paneth cell; mandibular prominence; abdominal wall; hand; maxillary prominence; fetal liver hematopoietic progenitor cell; primitive streak; Gonadal ridge; efferent ductule; More reference expression data
BioGPS	More reference expression data
Gene ontology
Molecular function	identical protein binding; single-stranded DNA binding; nucleotide binding; DNA helicase activity; DNA binding; protein binding; hydrolase activity; ATP binding; helicase activity; DNA replication origin binding; single-stranded 3'-5' DNA helicase activity
Cellular component	MCM complex; nucleus; nucleoplasm
Biological process	G1 phase; DNA replication; cell cycle; DNA replication initiation; DNA unwinding involved in DNA replication; G1/S transition of mitotic cell cycle; double-strand break repair via break-induced replication; pre-replicative complex assembly involved in nuclear cell cycle DNA replication; mitotic DNA replication
Sources:Amigo / QuickGO
Orthologs
Databases	NCBI: entry; OMA: entry
Species	Human	Mouse
Entrez	4175	17219
Ensembl	ENSG00000076003	ENSMUSG00000026355
UniProt	Q14566	P97311
RefSeq (mRNA)	NM_005915	NM_008567; NM_001313695
RefSeq (protein)	NP_005906	NP_001300624; NP_032593
Location (UCSC)	Chr 2: 135.84 – 135.88 Mb	Chr 1: 128.26 – 128.29 Mb
PubMed search
- Wikidata
View/Edit Human	View/Edit Mouse

DNA replication licensing factor MCM6 is a protein that in humans is encoded by the MCM6 gene. MCM6 is one of the highly conserved mini-chromosome maintenance proteins (MCM) that is essential for the initiation of eukaryotic genome replication.

== Function ==
The MCM complex consisting of MCM6 (this protein) and MCM2, 4 and 7 possesses DNA helicase activity, and may act as a DNA unwinding enzyme. The hexameric protein complex formed by the MCM proteins is a key component of the pre-replication complex (pre-RC) and may be involved in the formation of replication forks and in the recruitment of other DNA replication related proteins. The phosphorylation of the complex by CDC2 kinase reduces the helicase activity, suggesting a role in the regulation of DNA replication. Mcm 6 has recently been shown to interact strongly Cdt1 at defined residues, by mutating these target residues Wei et al. observed lack of Cdt1 recruitment of Mcm2-7 to the pre-RC.

== Gene ==
The MCM6 gene, MCM6, is expressed at very high level. MCM6 contains 18 introns. There are 2 non overlapping alternative last exons. The transcripts appear to differ by truncation of the 3' end, presence or absence of 2 cassette exons, common exons with different boundaries.

MCM6 produces, by alternative splicing, 3 different transcripts, all with introns, putatively encoding 3 different protein isoforms.

MCM6 contains two of the regulatory regions for LCT, the gene encoding the protein lactase, located in two of the MCM6 introns, approximately 14 kb and 22 kb upstream of LCT. A substitution of thymine for cytosine in the first region (at -13910), in particular, has been shown to function in vitro as an enhancer element capable of differentially activating transcription of LCT promoter.

Mutations in these regions are associated with lactose tolerance into adult life.

== Interactions ==
MCM6 has been shown to interact with:

- CDC45-related protein,
- MCM2,
- MCM4,
- MCM7,
- ORC1L,
- ORC2L,
- ORC4L, and
- Replication protein A1.

== See also ==
- Mini Chromosome Maintenance
