= MCM10 =

Protein-coding gene in the species Homo sapiens

Identifiers
- Aliases: MCM10, CNA43, DNA43, PRO2249, minichromosome maintenance 10 replication initiation factor, IMD80
- External IDs: OMIM: 609357; MGI: 1917274; HomoloGene: 41275; GeneCards: MCM10; OMA:MCM10 - orthologs

Gene location (Human)
Chr.	Chromosome 10 (human)
Band	10p13	Start	13,161,558 bp
Band	10p13	End	13,211,110 bp

Gene location (Mouse)
Chr.	Chromosome 2 (mouse)
Band	2|2 A1	Start	4,994,525 bp
Band	2|2 A1	End	5,017,602 bp
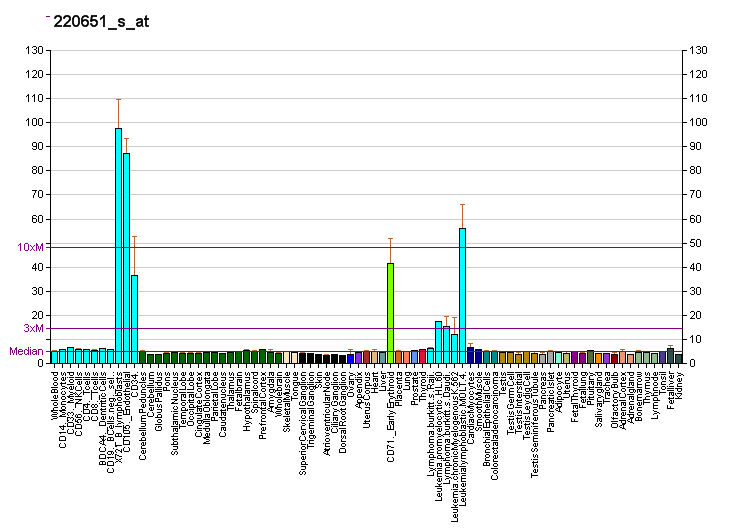
RNA expression pattern
Bgee	Human / Mouse (ortholog); Top expressed in: secondary oocyte; ventricular zone; ganglionic eminence; gonad; amniotic fluid; bone marrow; testicle; gingival epithelium; trabecular bone; bone marrow cell / Top expressed in: zygote; secondary oocyte; primary oocyte; otic placode; tail of embryo; left lobe of liver; otic vesicle; primitive streak; genital tubercle; epiblast; More reference expression data
BioGPS	More reference expression data
Gene ontology
Molecular function	DNA binding; protein binding; DNA replication origin binding; single-stranded DNA binding; identical protein binding; metal ion binding; enzyme binding; double-stranded DNA binding
Cellular component	nucleolus; nucleoplasm; replication fork protection complex; nucleus
Biological process	DNA replication; cellular response to DNA damage stimulus; cell population proliferation; DNA replication initiation; G1/S transition of mitotic cell cycle
Sources:Amigo / QuickGO
Orthologs
Species	Human	Mouse
Entrez	55388	70024
Ensembl	ENSG00000065328	ENSMUSG00000026669
UniProt	Q7L590	Q0VBD2
RefSeq (mRNA)	NM_018518; NM_182751	NM_027290; NM_001305259
RefSeq (protein)	NP_060988; NP_877428	NP_001292188; NP_081566
Location (UCSC)	Chr 10: 13.16 – 13.21 Mb	Chr 2: 4.99 – 5.02 Mb
PubMed search
- Wikidata
View/Edit Human	View/Edit Mouse

Protein MCM10 homolog is a protein that in humans is encoded by the MCM10 gene. It is essential for activation of the Cdc45:Mcm2-7:GINS helicase, and thus required for proper DNA replication.

== Function ==
The protein encoded by this gene is one of the highly conserved mini-chromosome maintenance proteins (MCM) that are involved in the initiation of eukaryotic genome replication. The protein complex formed by MCM proteins is a key component of the pre-replication complex (pre-RC) and it may be involved in the formation of replication forks and in the recruitment of other DNA replication related proteins. This protein can interact with MCM2 and MCM6, as well as with the origin recognition protein ORC2. It is regulated by proteolysis and phosphorylation in a cell cycle-dependent manner. Studies of a similar protein in Xenopus suggest that the chromatin binding of this protein at the onset of DNA replication is after pre-RC assembly and before origin unwinding. Alternatively spliced transcript variants encoding distinct isoforms have been identified.

== Interactions ==
MCM10 has been shown to interact with ORC2L.
