= MCM2 =

Protein-coding gene in humans

Identifiers
- Aliases: MCM2, BM28, CCNL1, CDCL1, D3S3194, MITOTIN, cdc19, minichromosome maintenance complex component 2, DFNA70
- External IDs: OMIM: 116945; MGI: 105380; GeneCards: MCM2
Available structures
PDB	Ortholog search: PDBe RCSB
PDB	List of PDB id codes 4UUZ, 5BNV, 5BNX, 5BO0, 5C3I, 5JA4
Enzyme activity
EC #	BRENDA	ExPASy	KEGG	MetaCyc
3.6.4.12	↗	↗	↗	↗

Gene location (Human)
Chr.	Chromosome 3 (human)
Band	3q21.3	Start	127,598,410 bp
Band	3q21.3	End	127,622,436 bp

Gene location (Mouse)
Chr.	Chromosome 6 (mouse)
Band	6|6 D1	Start	88,860,456 bp
Band	6|6 D1	End	88,875,762 bp
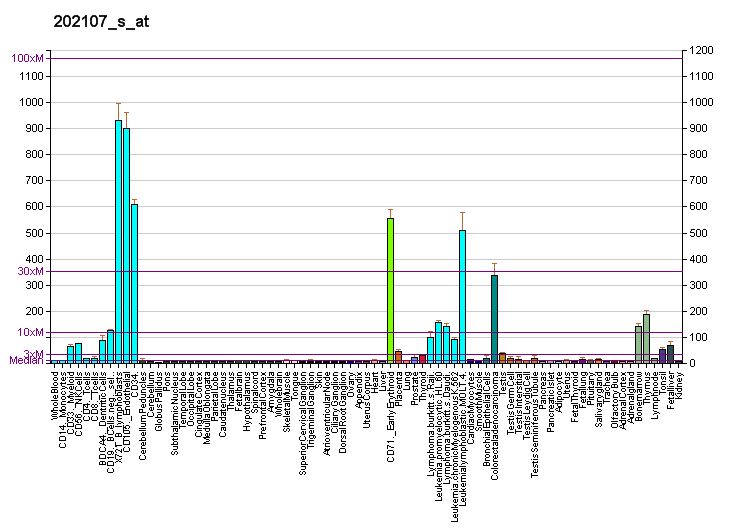
RNA expression pattern
Bgee	Human / Mouse (ortholog); Top expressed in: oocyte; secondary oocyte; ventricular zone; embryo; ganglionic eminence; trabecular bone; bone marrow cell; gonad; gingival epithelium; appendix / Top expressed in: tibiofemoral joint; mandibular prominence; maxillary prominence; epiblast; tail of embryo; somite; primitive streak; fetal liver hematopoietic progenitor cell; ventricular zone; genital tubercle; More reference expression data
BioGPS	More reference expression data
Gene ontology
Molecular function	DNA binding; nucleotide binding; helicase activity; histone binding; metal ion binding; DNA helicase activity; protein binding; enzyme binding; DNA replication origin binding; hydrolase activity; ATP binding; single-stranded DNA binding; single-stranded DNA helicase activity; 3'-5' DNA helicase activity
Cellular component	cytoplasm; microtubule cytoskeleton; nucleoplasm; nuclear origin of replication recognition complex; chromatin; MCM complex; nucleus; cytosol; nucleolus
Biological process	cellular response to interleukin-4; nucleosome assembly; G1 phase; DNA replication; DNA replication initiation; DNA unwinding involved in DNA replication; apoptotic process; cell cycle; cochlea development; G1/S transition of mitotic cell cycle; negative regulation of DNA helicase activity; double-strand break repair via break-induced replication; pre-replicative complex assembly involved in nuclear cell cycle DNA replication; mitotic DNA replication initiation
Sources:Amigo / QuickGO
Orthologs
Databases	NCBI: entry; OMA: entry
Species	Human	Mouse
Entrez	4171	17216
Ensembl	ENSG00000073111	ENSMUSG00000002870
UniProt	P49736	P97310
RefSeq (mRNA)	NM_004526	NM_008564
RefSeq (protein)	NP_004517	NP_032590
Location (UCSC)	Chr 3: 127.6 – 127.62 Mb	Chr 6: 88.86 – 88.88 Mb
PubMed search
- Wikidata
View/Edit Human	View/Edit Mouse

DNA replication licensing factor MCM2 is a protein that in humans is encoded by the MCM2 gene.

== Function ==
The protein encoded by this gene is one of the highly conserved mini-chromosome maintenance proteins (MCM) that are involved in the initiation of eukaryotic genome replication. The hexameric protein complex formed by MCM proteins is a key component of the pre-replication complex (pre-RC) and may be involved in the formation of replication forks and in the recruitment of other DNA replication-related proteins. This protein forms a complex with MCM4, 6, and 7, and has been shown to regulate the helicase activity of the complex. This protein is phosphorylated, and thus regulated by, protein kinases CDC2 and CDC7.

== Interactions ==
MCM2 has been shown to interact with:

- AKAP8,
- Cell division cycle 7-related protein kinase,
- MCM3,
- MCM4,
- MCM5,
- MCM6,
- MCM7,
- ORC1L,
- ORC2L,
- ORC4L,
- ORC5L, and
- Replication protein A1.

== See also ==
- Mini Chromosome Maintenance
