= ORC5 =

Protein-coding gene in the species Homo sapiens

Identifiers
- Aliases: ORC5, ORC5L, ORC5P, ORC5T, PPP1R117, origin recognition complex subunit 5
- External IDs: OMIM: 602331; MGI: 1347044; GeneCards: ORC5

Gene location (Human)
Chr.	Chromosome 7 (human)
Band	7q22.1-q22.2	Start	104,126,341 bp
Band	7q22.1-q22.2	End	104,208,047 bp

Gene location (Mouse)
Chr.	Chromosome 5 (mouse)
Band	5|5 A3	Start	22,691,483 bp
Band	5|5 A3	End	22,755,427 bp
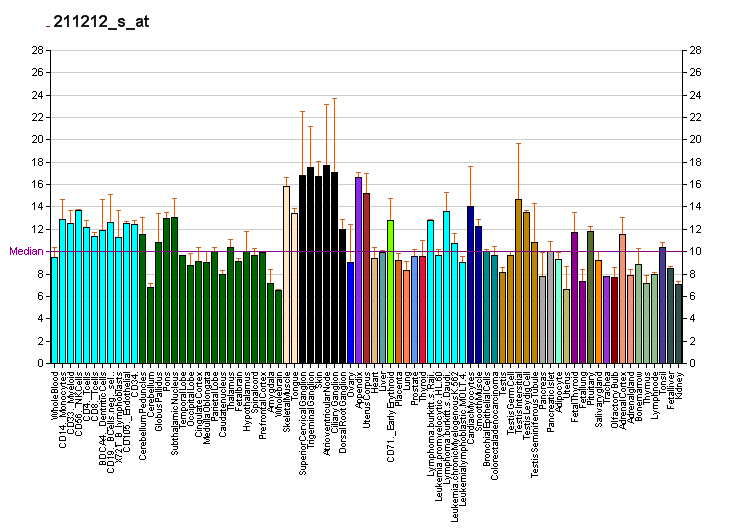

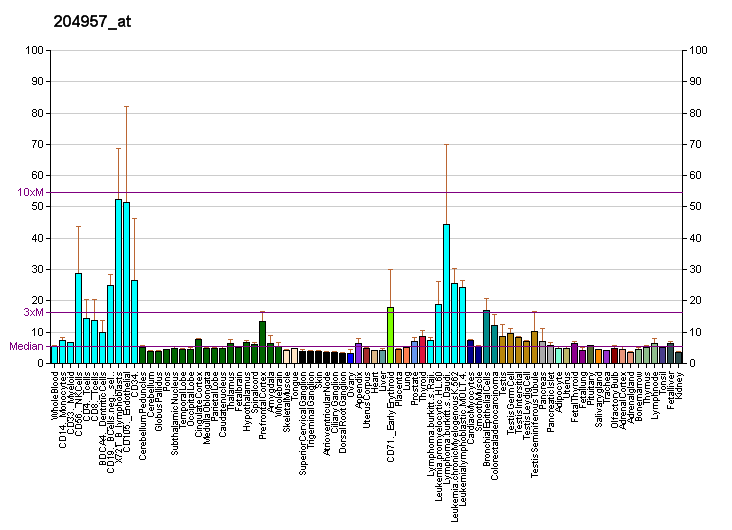
RNA expression pattern
Bgee	Human / Mouse (ortholog); Top expressed in: secondary oocyte; endothelial cell; gonad; testicle; middle temporal gyrus; buccal mucosa cell; Brodmann area 23; ventricular zone; Achilles tendon; body of pancreas / Top expressed in: primary oocyte; secondary oocyte; zygote; spermatocyte; epiblast; fetal liver hematopoietic progenitor cell; primitive streak; spermatid; endocardial cushion; embryo; More reference expression data
BioGPS	More reference expression data
Gene ontology
Molecular function	nucleotide binding; DNA replication origin binding; protein binding; ATP binding; molecular function
Cellular component	nuclear origin of replication recognition complex; origin recognition complex; nucleus; nucleoplasm; cytosol
Biological process	G1 phase; DNA replication; DNA replication initiation; G1/S transition of mitotic cell cycle
Sources:Amigo / QuickGO
Orthologs
Databases	NCBI: entry; OMA: entry
Species	Human	Mouse
Entrez	5001	26429
Ensembl	ENSG00000164815	ENSMUSG00000029012
UniProt	O43913	Q9WUV0
RefSeq (mRNA)	NM_001197292; NM_002553; NM_181747	NM_011959
RefSeq (protein)	NP_002544; NP_859531	NP_036089
Location (UCSC)	Chr 7: 104.13 – 104.21 Mb	Chr 5: 22.69 – 22.76 Mb
PubMed search
- Wikidata
View/Edit Human	View/Edit Mouse

Origin recognition complex subunit 5 is a protein that in humans is encoded by the ORC5 (ORC5L) gene.

== Function ==
The origin recognition complex (ORC) is a highly conserved six subunit protein complex essential for the initiation of the DNA replication in eukaryotic cells. Studies in yeast demonstrated that ORC binds specifically to origins of replication and serves as a platform for the assembly of additional initiation factors such as Cdc6 and Mcm proteins. The protein encoded by this gene is a subunit of the ORC complex. It has been shown to form a core complex with ORC2L, -3L, and 4L. Alternatively spliced transcript variants encoding distinct isoforms have been described.

== Interactions ==
ORC5 has been shown to interact with:

- MCM2,
- MCM3,
- MCM4,
- MCM7,
- ORC1,
- ORC2,
- ORC3, and
- ORC4.
