= ORC3 =

Protein-coding gene in the species Homo sapiens

Identifiers
- Aliases: ORC3, LAT, LATHEO, ORC3L, origin recognition complex subunit 3
- External IDs: OMIM: 604972; MGI: 1354944; GeneCards: ORC3

Gene location (Human)
Chr.	Chromosome 6 (human)
Band	6q15	Start	87,590,067 bp
Band	6q15	End	87,667,453 bp

Gene location (Mouse)
Chr.	Chromosome 4 (mouse)
Band	4|4 A5	Start	34,570,796 bp
Band	4|4 A5	End	34,614,944 bp
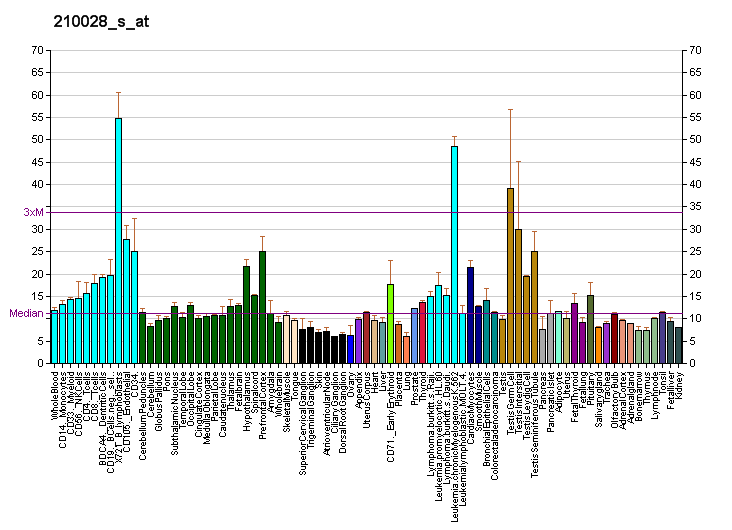
RNA expression pattern
Bgee	Human / Mouse (ortholog); Top expressed in: triceps brachii muscle; Achilles tendon; ventricular zone; glutes; gonad; embryo; ganglionic eminence; testicle; right adrenal gland; right adrenal cortex / Top expressed in: genital tubercle; tail of embryo; spermatocyte; epiblast; zygote; ventricular zone; maxillary prominence; neural layer of retina; mandibular prominence; lens; More reference expression data
BioGPS	More reference expression data
Gene ontology
Molecular function	DNA binding; DNA replication origin binding; protein binding
Cellular component	nuclear origin of replication recognition complex; origin recognition complex; nucleus; nucleoplasm; nuclear pre-replicative complex; DNA replication preinitiation complex; nuclear body
Biological process	G1 phase; DNA replication; neural precursor cell proliferation; DNA replication initiation; pre-replicative complex assembly involved in nuclear cell cycle DNA replication; G1/S transition of mitotic cell cycle
Sources:Amigo / QuickGO
Orthologs
Databases	NCBI: entry; OMA: entry
Species	Human	Mouse
Entrez	23595	50793
Ensembl	ENSG00000135336	ENSMUSG00000040044
UniProt	Q9UBD5	Q9JK30
RefSeq (mRNA)	NM_001197259; NM_012381; NM_181837	NM_001159563; NM_015824
RefSeq (protein)	NP_001184188; NP_036513; NP_862820	NP_001153035; NP_056639
Location (UCSC)	Chr 6: 87.59 – 87.67 Mb	Chr 4: 34.57 – 34.61 Mb
PubMed search
- Wikidata
View/Edit Human	View/Edit Mouse

Origin recognition complex (ORC) subunit 3 N-terminus

Identifiers
- Symbol: ORC3_N
- Pfam: PF07034
- InterPro: IPR010748
Available protein structures:
- PDB: IPR010748 PF07034 (ECOD; PDBsum)
- AlphaFold: IPR010748; PF07034

Origin recognition complex subunit 3 is a protein that in humans is encoded by the ORC3 (ORC3L) gene.

== Function ==
The origin recognition complex (ORC) is a highly conserved six subunits protein complex essential for the initiation of the DNA replication in eukaryotic cells. Studies in yeast demonstrated that ORC binds specifically to origins of replication and serves as a platform for the assembly of additional initiation factors such as Cdc6 and Mcm proteins. The protein encoded by this gene is a subunit of the ORC complex. Studies of a similar gene in Drosophila suggested a possible role of this protein in neuronal proliferation and olfactory memory. Alternatively spliced transcript variants encoding distinct isoforms have been reported for this gene.

== Interactions ==
ORC3 has been shown to interact with:

- MCM4,
- MCM7,
- ORC2,
- ORC4,
- ORC5, and
- ORC6.
