= MCM7 =

Protein-coding gene in humans

Identifiers
- Aliases: MCM7, CDC47, MCM2, P1.1-MCM3, P1CDC47, P85MCM, PNAS146, PPP1R104, minichromosome maintenance complex component 7
- External IDs: OMIM: 600592; MGI: 1298398; GeneCards: MCM7
Enzyme activity
| EC # | BRENDA | ExPASy | KEGG | MetaCyc |
|---|---|---|---|---|
| 3.6.4.12 | ↗ | ↗ | ↗ | ↗ |

Gene location (Human)
| Chr. | Chromosome 7 (human) |
| Band | 7q22.1 | Start | 100,092,728 bp |
| Band | 7q22.1 | End | 100,101,940 bp |

Gene location (Mouse)
| Chr. | Chromosome 5 (mouse) |
| Band | 5|5 G2 | Start | 138,162,845 bp |
| Band | 5|5 G2 | End | 138,170,684 bp |
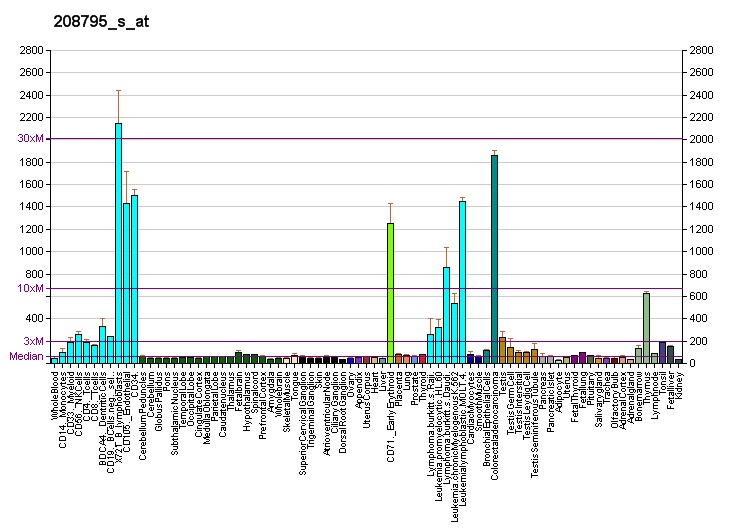

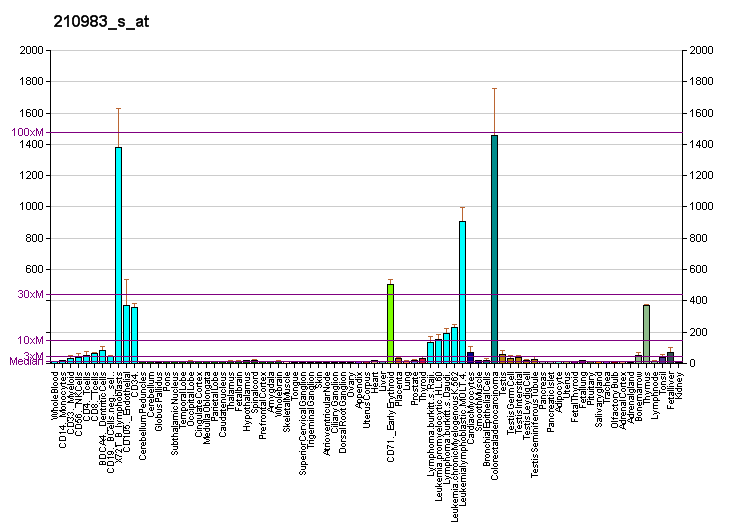
RNA expression pattern
| Bgee | Human / Mouse (ortholog); Top expressed in: ganglionic eminence; ventricular zone; mucosa of transverse colon; lymph node; C1 segment; right testis; appendix; left testis; granulocyte; bone marrow / Top expressed in: ventricular zone; epiblast; bone marrow; thymus; genital tubercle; tail of embryo; ganglionic eminence; embryo; embryo; yolk sac; More reference expression data |
| BioGPS | More reference expression data |
Gene ontology
| Molecular function | nucleotide binding; helicase activity; DNA helicase activity; single-stranded DNA binding; protein binding; hydrolase activity; ATP binding; DNA binding; DNA replication origin binding; single-stranded 3'-5' DNA helicase activity |
| Cellular component | membrane; nucleoplasm; chromatin; MCM complex; cytosol; nucleus; nucleolus |
| Biological process | cellular response to organic substance; G1 phase; cellular response to xenobiotic stimulus; regulation of phosphorylation; cellular response to DNA damage stimulus; cellular response to epidermal growth factor stimulus; DNA replication initiation; cell cycle; cell population proliferation; DNA unwinding involved in DNA replication; DNA replication; G1/S transition of mitotic cell cycle; double-strand break repair via break-induced replication; pre-replicative complex assembly involved in nuclear cell cycle DNA replication; DNA strand elongation involved in DNA replication |
Sources:Amigo / QuickGO
Orthologs
| Databases | NCBI: entry; OMA: entry |
| Species | Human | Mouse |
| Entrez | 4176 | 17220 |
| Ensembl | ENSG00000166508 | ENSMUSG00000029730 |
| UniProt | P33993 | Q61881 |
| RefSeq (mRNA) | NM_001278595; NM_005916; NM_182776 | NM_008568; NM_001356576; NM_001356577 |
| RefSeq (protein) | NP_001265524; NP_005907; NP_877577 | NP_032594; NP_001343505; NP_001343506 |
| Location (UCSC) | Chr 7: 100.09 – 100.1 Mb | Chr 5: 138.16 – 138.17 Mb |
| PubMed search |
- Wikidata
| View/Edit Human | View/Edit Mouse |

DNA replication licensing factor MCM7 is a protein that in humans is encoded by the MCM7 gene.

== Function ==
The protein encoded by this gene is one of the highly conserved minichromosome maintenance proteins (MCM) that are essential for the initiation of eukaryotic genome replication. The hexameric protein complex formed by the MCM proteins is a key component of the pre-replication complex (pre-RC) and may be involved in the formation of replication forks and in the recruitment of other DNA-replication-related proteins. The MCM complex consisting of this protein and MCM2, 4 and 6 proteins possesses DNA helicase activity, and may act as a DNA unwinding enzyme. Cyclin D1-dependent kinase, CDK4, is found to associate with this protein, and may regulate the binding of this protein with the tumor suppressor protein RB1/RB. Alternatively spliced transcript variants encoding distinct isoforms have been reported.

== Interactions ==
MCM7 has been shown to interact with:

- CDC45-related protein
- CDC6,
- Cell division cycle 7-related protein kinase,
- DBF4,
- MCM2,
- MCM3,
- MCM4,
- MCM5,
- MCM6,
- MNAT1,
- ORC1L,
- ORC2L,
- ORC3L,
- ORC5L,
- Replication protein A1,
- Retinoblastoma protein, and
- UBE3A.

== See also ==
- Mini Chromosome Maintenance
