= Pre-replication complex =

Protein complex formed during initiation of DNA replication

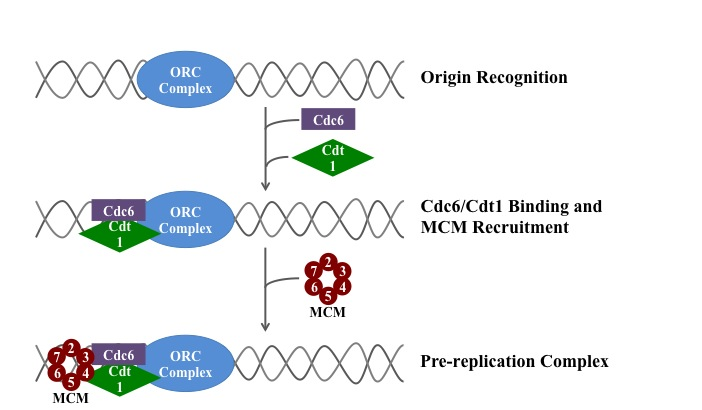
A simplified schematic of the loading of the eukaryotic pre-replication complex

A pre-replication complex (pre-RC) is a protein complex that forms at the origin of replication during the initiation step of DNA replication. Formation of the pre-RC is required for DNA replication to occur. Complete and faithful replication of the genome ensures that each daughter cell will carry the same genetic information as the parent cell. Accordingly, formation of the pre-RC is a very important part of the cell cycle.

== Components ==
As organisms evolved and became increasingly more complex, so did their pre-RCs. The following is a summary of the components of the pre-RC amongst the different domains of life.

In bacteria, the main component of the pre-RC is DnaA. The pre-RC is complete when DnaA occupies all of its binding sites within the bacterial origin of replication (oriC). The particular sites on the oriC that DnaA binds to determines if the cell has a bORC (bacterial Origin Recognition Complex) or a pre-RC.

The archaeal pre-RC is very different from the bacterial pre-RC and can serve as a simplified model of the eukaryotic pre-RC. It is composed of a single origin recognition complex (ORC) protein, Cdc6/ORC1, and a homohexamer of the minichromosome maintenance (MCM) protein. Sulfolobus islandicus also uses a Cdt1 homologue to recognize one of its replication origins.

The eukaryotic pre-RC is the most complex and highly regulated pre-RC. In most eukaryotes it is composed of six ORC proteins (ORC1-6), Cdc6, Cdt1, and a heterohexamer of the six MCM proteins (MCM2-7). The MCM heterohexamer arguably arose via MCM gene duplication events and subsequent divergent evolution. The pre-RC of Schizosaccharomyces pombe (S. pombe) is notably different from that of other eukaryotes; Cdc6 is replaced by the homologous Cdc18 protein. Sap1 is also included in the S. pombe pre-RC because it is required for Cdc18 binding. The pre-RC of Xenopus laevis (X. laevis) also has an additional protein, MCM9, which helps load the MCM heterohexamer onto the origin of replication. The structure of the ORC, MCM, as well as the intermediate ORC-Cdc6-Cdt1-Mcm2-7 (OCCM) complex has been resolved.

== Recognition of the origin of replication ==
Recognition of the origin of replication is a critical first step in the formation of the pre-RC. In different domains of life this process is accomplished differently.

In prokaryotes, origin recognition is accomplished by DnaA. DnaA binds tightly to a 9-base pair consensus sequence in oriC; 5' – TTATCCACA – 3'. There are 5 such 9-bp sequences (R1-R5) and 4 non-consensus sequences (I1-I4) within oriC that DnaA binds with differential affinity. DnaA binds R4, R1, and R2 with high affinity and R5, I1, I2, I3, and R3 with lesser affinity. In vivo, it has been observed that the DnaA binding to recognition sites occurs in the order: R1, R2, then R4, which forms the bORC. Afterwards, the other lower affinity, 9 bp recognition sites bind to DnaA, which forms the pre-RC.

Archaea have 1–3 origins of replication. The origins are generally AT-rich tracts that vary based on the archaeal species. The singular archaeal ORC protein recognizes the AT-rich tracts and binds DNA in an ATP-dependent fashion.

Eukaryotes typically have multiple origins of replication; at least one per chromosome. Saccharomyces cerevisiae (S. cerevisiae) is the only known eukaryote with a defined initiation sequence TTTTTATG/ATTTA/T. This initiation sequence is recognized by ORC1-5. ORC6 is not known to bind DNA in S. cerevisiae. Initiation sequences in S. pombe and higher eukaryotes are not well defined. However, the initiation sequences are generally either AT-rich or exhibit bent or curved DNA topology. The ORC4 protein is known to bind the AT-rich portion of the origin of replication in S. pombe using AT hook motifs. The mechanism of origin recognition in higher eukaryotes is not well understood but it is thought that the ORC1-6 proteins depend on unusual DNA topology for binding.

== Loading ==
Overview of chromosome duplication in the cell cycle

Assembly of the pre-replication complex only occurs during late M phase and early G1 phase of the cell cycle when cyclin-dependent kinase (CDK) activity is low. This timing and other regulatory mechanisms ensure that DNA replication will only occur once per cell cycle. Assembly of the pre-RC relies on prior origin recognition, either by DnaA in prokaryotes or by ORC in archaea and eukaryotes.

The pre-RC of prokaryotes is complete when DnaA occupies all possible binding sites within the oriC. DnaA can only bind to the low affinity sites on the oriC once the protein fis is removed from the oriC. Removal of fis, the protein IHF (integrated host factor) binds to a site between R1 and R2, which allows DnaA to bind to the low affinity sites on the oriC. This completes the pre-RC.

The pre-RC of archaea requires ORC binding of the origin. After this, Cdc6 and the MCM homohexameric complex bind in a sequential fashion.

Eukaryotes have the most complex pre-RC. After ORC1-6 bind the origin of replication, Cdc6 is recruited. Cdc6 recruits the licensing factor Cdt1 and MCM2-7. Cdt1 binding and ATP hydrolysis by the ORC and Cdc6 load MCM2-7 onto DNA. There is a stoichiometric excess of the MCM proteins over the ORC and Cdc6 proteins, indicating that there may be multiple MCM heterohexamers bound to each origin of replication.

== Initiation of replication ==
After the pre-RC is formed it must be activated and the replisome assembled in order for DNA replication to occur.

In prokaryotes, DnaA hydrolyzes ATP in order to unwind DNA at the oriC. This denatured region is accessible to the DnaB helicase and DnaC helicase loader. Single-strand binding proteins stabilize the newly formed replication bubble and interact with the DnaG primase. DnaG recruits the replicative DNA polymerase III, and replication begins.

In eukaryotes, MCM heterohexamer is phosphorylated by CDC7 and CDK, which displaces Cdc6 and recruits MCM10. MCM10 cooperates with MCM2-7 in the recruitment of Cdc45. Cdc45 then recruits key components of the replisome; the replicative DNA polymerase α and its primase. DNA replication can then begin.

== Prevention of pre-replication complex re-assembly ==
During each cell cycle, it is important that the genome be completely replicated once and only once. Formation of the pre-replication complex during late M and early G1 phase is required for genome replication, but after the genome has been replicated the pre-RC must not form again until the next cell cycle.

In prokaryotes, various studies have demonstrated that the pre-RC is a complex that is only present for a fraction of the cell cycle. Once a cellular division occurs, the pre-RC must revert back to the bORC to ensure that only one round of DNA replication occurs during division. In E. coli, there are 11 GATC sites in the oriC that undergo hemimethylation during DNA replication. The protein SeqA binds to these sites preventing remethylation and blocking the binding of DnaA to low affinity sites for approximately one third of the cell cycle. However, SeqA does not block DnaA from binding to the R1, R2, and R4 sites. Thus, the bORC is reset and is prepared to undergo another conversion to the pre-RC.

In S. cerevisiae, CDKs prevent formation of the replication complex during late G1, S, and G2 phases by excluding MCM2-7 and Cdt1 from the nucleus, targeting Cdc6 for degradation by the proteasome, and dissociating ORC1-6 from chromatin via phosphorylation. Prevention of re-replication in S. pombe is slightly different; Cdt1 is degraded by the proteasome instead of merely being excluded from the nucleus. Proteolytic regulation of Cdt1 is shared by higher eukaryotes including Caenorhabditis elegans, Drosophila melanogaster, X. laevis, and mammals. Metazoans have a fourth mechanism to prevent re-replication; during S and G2 geminin binds to Cdt1 and inhibits Cdt1 from loading MCM2-7 onto the origin of replication.

== Meier-Gorlin syndrome ==
Defects in components of the eukaryotic replication complex are known to cause Meier-Gorlin syndrome, which is characterized by dwarfism, absent or hypoplastic patellae, small ears, impaired pre- and post-natal growth, and microcephaly. Known mutations are in the ORC1, ORC4, ORC6, CDT1, and CDC6 genes. The disease phenotype probably originates from reduced ability of cells to proliferate, leading to cell number, and general growth failure.
