= ORC1 =

Protein-coding gene in humans

Identifiers
- Aliases: ORC1, HSORC1L, PARC1, origin recognition complex subunit 1
- External IDs: OMIM: 601902; MGI: 1328337; GeneCards: ORC1

Gene location (Human)
Chr.	Chromosome 1 (human)
Band	1p32.3	Start	52,372,829 bp
Band	1p32.3	End	52,404,423 bp

Gene location (Mouse)
Chr.	Chromosome 4 (mouse)
Band	4|4 C7	Start	108,436,620 bp
Band	4|4 C7	End	108,472,030 bp
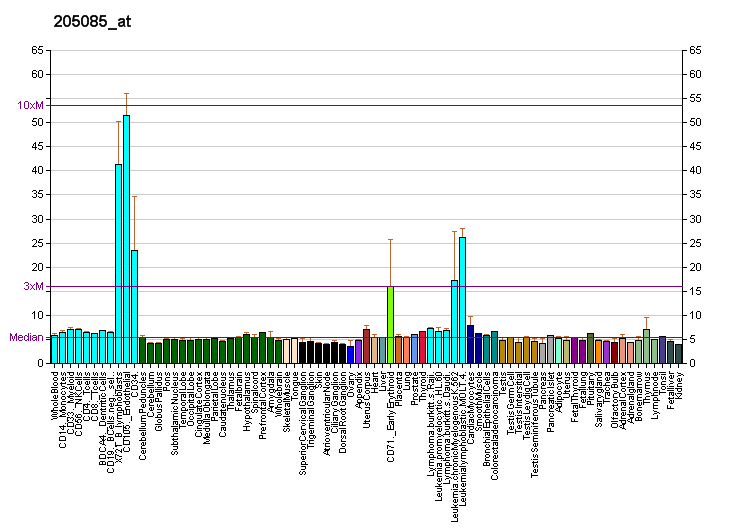
RNA expression pattern
Bgee	Human / Mouse (ortholog); Top expressed in: testicle; ventricular zone; gonad; ganglionic eminence; bone marrow; mucosa of transverse colon; secondary oocyte; rectum; stromal cell of endometrium; bone marrow cell / Top expressed in: zygote; secondary oocyte; primary oocyte; epiblast; tail of embryo; genital tubercle; primitive streak; embryo; embryo; blastocyst; More reference expression data
BioGPS	More reference expression data
Gene ontology
Molecular function	DNA binding; nucleotide binding; chromatin binding; protein binding; ATP binding; DNA replication origin binding; metal ion binding
Cellular component	nuclear origin of replication recognition complex; plasma membrane; nucleolus; origin recognition complex; nucleus; nucleoplasm; cytosol
Biological process	G1 phase; DNA replication; regulation of transcription involved in G1/S transition of mitotic cell cycle; DNA replication initiation; G1/S transition of mitotic cell cycle; mitotic cell cycle; mitotic DNA replication checkpoint signaling
Sources:Amigo / QuickGO
Orthologs
Databases	NCBI: entry; OMA: entry
Species	Human	Mouse
Entrez	4998	18392
Ensembl	ENSG00000085840	ENSMUSG00000028587
UniProt	Q13415	Q9Z1N2
RefSeq (mRNA)	NM_001190818; NM_001190819; NM_004153	NM_001014425; NM_011015
RefSeq (protein)	NP_001177747; NP_001177748; NP_004144	NP_035145
Location (UCSC)	Chr 1: 52.37 – 52.4 Mb	Chr 4: 108.44 – 108.47 Mb
PubMed search
- Wikidata
View/Edit Human	View/Edit Mouse

Origin recognition complex subunit 1 is a protein that in humans is encoded by the ORC1 gene. It is closely related to CDC6, and both are the same protein in archaea.

== Function ==
The origin recognition complex (ORC) is a highly conserved six subunits protein complex essential for the initiation of the DNA replication in eukaryotic cells. Studies in yeast demonstrated that ORC binds specifically to origins of replication and serves as a platform for the assembly of the pre-replication complex, which includes additional initiation factors such as Cdc6 and Mcm proteins. The protein encoded by this gene is the largest subunit of the origin recognition complex. While other ORC subunits are stable throughout the cell cycle, the levels of this protein vary during the cell cycle, which has been shown to be controlled by ubiquitin-mediated proteolysis after initiation of DNA replication. This protein is found to be selectively phosphorylated during mitosis. It is also reported to interact with MYST histone acetyltransferase 2 (MYST2/HBO1), a protein involved in control of transcription silencing.

== Interactions ==
ORC1 has been shown to interact with:

- CDC45-related protein and
- CDC6,
- Cell division cycle 7-related protein kinase,
- Cyclin-dependent kinase 2,
- MCM2,
- MCM4,
- MCM6,
- MCM7,
- MYST2,
- ORC2,
- ORC4,
- ORC5, and
- SKP2.
