= ORC4 =

Protein-coding gene in the species Homo sapiens

Identifiers
- Aliases: ORC4, ORC4L, ORC4P, origin recognition complex subunit 4
- External IDs: OMIM: 603056; MGI: 1347043; GeneCards: ORC4

Gene location (Human)
| Chr. | Chromosome 2 (human) |
| Band | 2q23.1 | Start | 147,930,396 bp |
| Band | 2q23.1 | End | 148,021,604 bp |

Gene location (Mouse)
| Chr. | Chromosome 2 (mouse) |
| Band | 2|2 C1.1 | Start | 48,792,836 bp |
| Band | 2|2 C1.1 | End | 48,840,289 bp |
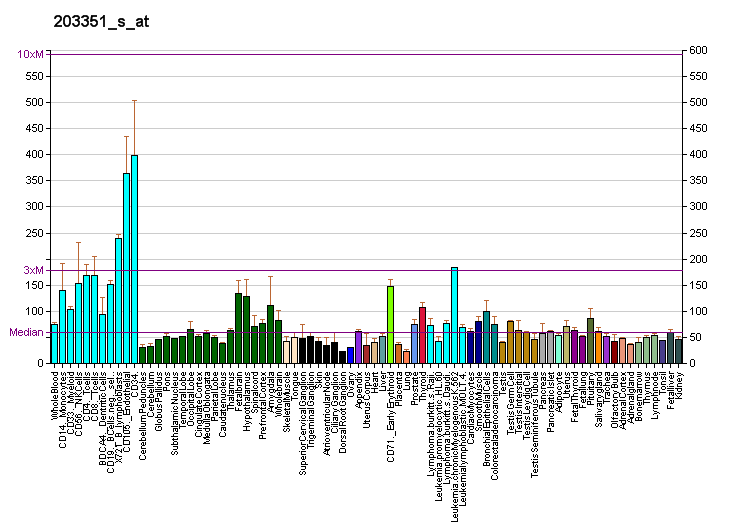

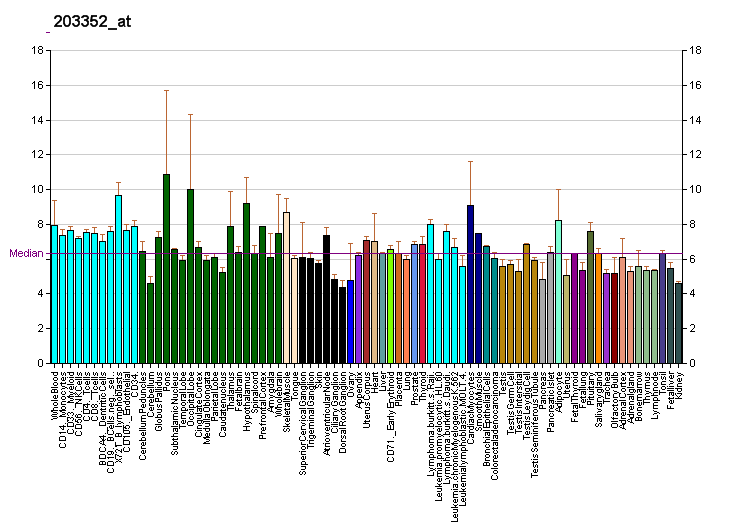
RNA expression pattern
| Bgee | Human / Mouse (ortholog); Top expressed in: Achilles tendon; oocyte; islet of Langerhans; ganglionic eminence; kidney tubule; bronchial epithelial cell; corpus callosum; endothelial cell; ventricular zone; right uterine tube / Top expressed in: otic placode; saccule; otic vesicle; spermatocyte; tail of embryo; ventricular zone; neural layer of retina; embryo; epiblast; superior frontal gyrus; More reference expression data |
| BioGPS | More reference expression data |
Gene ontology
| Molecular function | nucleotide binding; DNA binding; DNA replication origin binding; protein binding; ATP binding |
| Cellular component | nuclear origin of replication recognition complex; nucleolus; origin recognition complex; nucleus; nucleoplasm; cytosol |
| Biological process | G1 phase; DNA replication; DNA replication initiation; G1/S transition of mitotic cell cycle |
Sources:Amigo / QuickGO
Orthologs
| Databases | NCBI: entry; OMA: entry |
| Species | Human | Mouse |
| Entrez | 5000 | 26428 |
| Ensembl | ENSG00000115947 | ENSMUSG00000026761 |
| UniProt | O43929 | O88708 |
| RefSeq (mRNA) | NM_001190879; NM_001190881; NM_001190882; NM_002552; NM_181741 NM_181742; NM_001374270; NM_001374272 | NM_001177313; NM_011958; NM_001355296 |
| RefSeq (protein) | NP_001177808; NP_001177810; NP_001177811; NP_002543; NP_859525 NP_859526; NP_001361199; NP_001361201 | NP_001170784; NP_036088; NP_001342225 |
| Location (UCSC) | Chr 2: 147.93 – 148.02 Mb | Chr 2: 48.79 – 48.84 Mb |
| PubMed search |
- Wikidata
| View/Edit Human | View/Edit Mouse |

Origin recognition complex subunit 4 is a protein that in humans is encoded by the ORC4 (ORC4L) gene.

== Function ==
The origin recognition complex (ORC) is a highly conserved six subunit protein complex essential for the initiation of the DNA replication in eukaryotic cells. Studies in yeast demonstrated that ORC binds specifically to origins of replication and serves as a platform for the assembly of additional initiation factors such as Cdc6 and Mcm proteins. The protein encoded by this gene is a subunit of the ORC complex. It has been shown to form a core complex with ORC2L, -3L, and -5L. Three alternatively spliced transcript variants encoding the same protein have been reported.

== Interactions ==
ORC4 has been shown to interact with:

- MCM2,
- MCM3,
- MCM4,
- MCM6,
- ORC1,
- ORC2,
- ORC3,
- ORC5, and
- ORC6.
