= Minichromosome maintenance =

MCM2-7 family
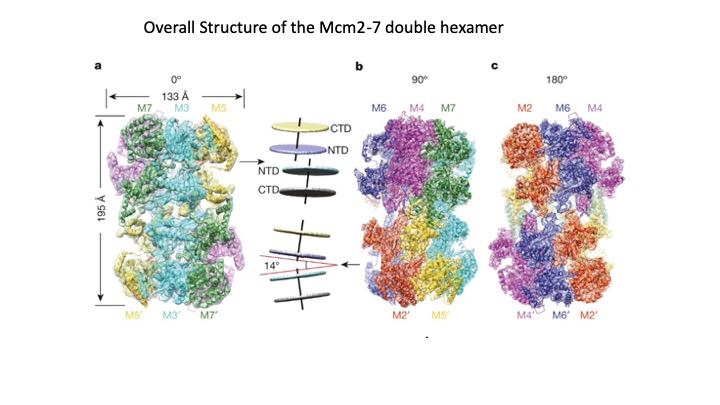
- Overall Structure of the Mcm2-7 double hexamer

Identifiers
- Symbol: MCM
- Pfam: PF00493
- Pfam clan: CL0023
- InterPro: IPR031327
- SMART: SM00350
- PROSITE: PDOC00662
Available protein structures:
- PDB: 1ltl IPR031327 PF00493 (ECOD; PDBsum)
- AlphaFold: IPR031327; PF00493
- Pfam maps to the core ATP binding domain.

The minichromosome maintenance protein complex (MCM) is a DNA helicase essential for genomic DNA replication. Eukaryotic MCM consists of six gene products, Mcm2–7, which form a heterohexamer. As a critical protein for cell division, MCM is also the target of various checkpoint pathways, such as the S-phase entry and S-phase arrest checkpoints. Both the loading and activation of MCM helicase are strictly regulated and are coupled to cell growth cycles. Deregulation of MCM function has been linked to genomic instability and a variety of carcinomas.

== History and structure ==
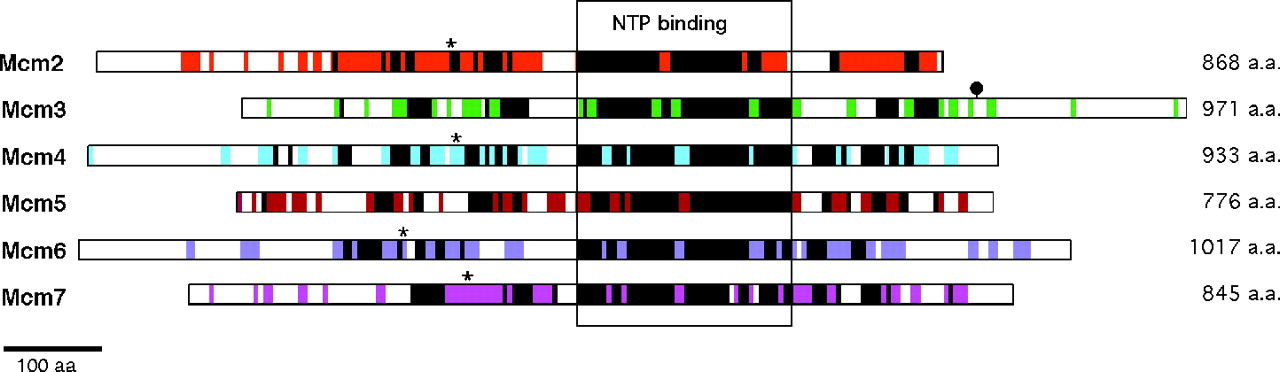
Homology shared by members of the Mcm2-7 protein family. Homology among the six members of the family are indicated in black. Homology of each member across species is indicated in colour.

The minichromosome maintenance proteins were named after a yeast genetics screen for mutants defective in the regulation of DNA replication initiation. The rationale behind this screen was that if replication origins were regulated in a manner analogous to transcription promoters, where transcriptional regulators showed promoter specificity, then replication regulators should also show origin specificity. Since eukaryotic chromosomes contain multiple replication origins and the plasmids contain only one, a slight defect in these regulators would have a dramatic effect on the replication of plasmids but little effect on chromosomes. In this screen, mutants conditional for plasmid loss were identified. In a secondary screen, these conditional mutants were selected for defects in plasmid maintenance against a collection of plasmids each carrying a different origin sequence. Two classes of mcm mutants were identified: Those that affected the stability of all minichromosomes and others that affected the stability of only a subset of the minichromosomes. The former were mutants defective in chromosome segregation such as mcm16, mcm20 and mcm21. Among the latter class of origin-specific mutants were mcm1, mcm2, mcm3, mcm5 and mcm10. Later on, others identified Mcm4, Mcm6 and Mcm7 in yeasts and other eukaryotes based on homology to Mcm2p, Mcm3p and Mcm5p expanding the MCM family to six, subsequently known as the Mcm2-7 family. In archaea, the heterohexamer ring is replaced by a homohexamer made up of a single type mcm protein, pointing at a history of gene duplication and diversification.

Mcm1 and Mcm10 are also involved in DNA replication, directly or indirectly, but have no sequence homology to the Mcm2-7 family.

== Function in DNA replication initiation and elongation ==
MCM2-7 is required for both DNA replication initiation and elongation; its regulation at each stage is a central feature of eukaryotic DNA replication. During G1 phase, the two head-to-head Mcm2-7 rings serve as the scaffold for the assembly of the bidirectional replication initiation complexes at the replication origin. During S phase, the Mcm2-7 complex forms the catalytic core of the Cdc45-MCM-GINS helicase - the DNA unwinding engine of the replisome.

=== G1/pre-replicative complex assembly ===
Site selection for replication origins is carried out by the Origin Recognition Complex (ORC), a six subunit complex (Orc1-6). During the G1 phase of the cell cycle, Cdc6 is recruited by ORC to form a launching pad for the loading of two head-to-head Mcm2-7 hexamers, also known as the pre-replication complex (pre-RC). There is genetic and biochemical evidence that the recruitment of the double hexamer may involve either one or two ORCs. Soluble Mcm2-7 hexamer forms a flexible left-handed open-ringed structure stabilised by Cdt1 prior to its loading onto chromatin, one at a time. The structure of the ORC-Cdc6-Cdt1-MCM (OCCM) intermediate formed after the loading of the first Cdt1-Mcm2-7 heptamer indicates that the winged helix domain at the C-terminal extensions (CTE) of the Mcm2-7 complex firmly anchor onto the surfaces created by the ORC-Cdc6 ring structure around origin DNA. The fusion of the two head-to-head Mcm2-7 hexamers is believed to be facilitated by the removal of Cdt1, leaving the NTDs of the two MCM hexamers flexible for inter-ring interactions. The loading of MCM2-7 onto DNA is an active process that requires ATP hydrolysis by both Orc1-6 and Cdc6. This process is coined "Replication Licensing" as it is a prerequisite for DNA replication initiation in every cell division cycle.

=== Late G1/early S - initiation ===
In late G1/early S phase, the pre-RC is activated for DNA unwinding by the cyclin-dependent kinases (CDKs) and DDK. This facilitates the loading of additional replication factors (e.g., Cdc45, MCM10, GINS, and DNA polymerases) and unwinding of the DNA at the origin. Once pre-RC formation is complete, Orc1-6 and Cdc6 are no longer required for MCM2-7 retention at the origin, and they are dispensable for subsequent DNA replication.

=== S-phase/elongation ===
Upon entry into S phase, the activity of the CDKs and the Dbf4-dependent kinase (DDK) Cdc7 promotes the assembly of replication forks, likely in part by activating MCM2-7 to unwind DNA. Following DNA polymerase loading, bidirectional DNA replication commences.

During S phase, Cdc6 and Cdt1 are degraded or inactivated to block additional pre-RC formation, and bidirectional DNA replication ensues. When the replication fork encounters lesions in the DNA, the S-phase checkpoint response slows or stops fork progression and stabilizes the association of MCM2-7 with the replication fork during DNA repair.

== Role in replication licensing ==
The replication licensing system acts to ensure that the no section of the genome is replicated more than once in a single cell cycle.

The inactivation of any of at least five of the six MCM subunits during S phase quickly blocks ongoing elongation. As a critical mechanism to ensure only a single round of DNA replication, the loading of additional MCM2-7 complexes into pre-RCs is inactivated by redundant means after passage into S phase.

MCM2-7 activity can also be regulated during elongation. The loss of replication fork integrity, an event precipitated by DNA damage, unusual DNA sequence, or insufficient deoxyribonucleotide precursors, can lead to the formation of DNA double-strand breaks and chromosome rearrangements. Normally, these replication problems trigger an S-phase checkpoint that minimizes genomic damage by blocking further elongation and physically stabilizing protein-DNA associations at the replication fork until the problem is fixed. This stabilization of the replication fork requires the physical interaction of MCM2-7 with Mrc1, Tof1, and Csm3 (M/T/C complex). In the absence of these proteins, dsDNA unwinding and replisome movement powered by MCM2-7 continue, but DNA synthesis stops. At least part of this stop is due to the dissociation of polymerase ε from the replication fork.

== Biochemical structure ==
Each subunit in the MCM structure contains two large N- and C-terminal domains. The N-terminal domain consists of three small sub-domains and appears to be used mainly for structural organization. The N-domain can coordinate with a neighboring subunit's C-terminal AAA+ helicase domain through a long and conserved loop. This conserved loop, named the allosteric control loop, has been shown to play a role in regulating interactions between N- and C-terminal regions by facilitating communication between the domains in response to ATP hydrolysis [10]. The N-domain also establishes the in vitro 3′→5′ directionality of MCM.

== Models of DNA unwinding ==
Regarding the physical mechanism of how a hexameric helicase unwinds DNA, two models have been proposed based on in vivo and in vitro data. In the "steric" model, the helicase tightly translocates along one strand of DNA while physically displacing the complementary strand. In the "pump" model, pairs of hexameric helicases unwind duplex DNA by either twisting it apart or extruding it through channels in the complex.

=== Steric model ===
The steric model hypothesizes that the helicase encircles dsDNA and, after local melting of the duplex DNA at the origin, translocates away from the origin, dragging a rigid proteinaceous "wedge" (either part of the helicase itself or another associated protein) that separates the DNA strands.

=== Pump model ===
The pump model postulates that multiple helicases load at replication origins, translocate away from one another, and in some manner eventually become anchored in place. They then rotate dsDNA in opposite directions, resulting in the unwinding of the double helix in the intervening region. The pump model has also been proposed to be restricted to the melting of origin DNA while the Mcm2-7 complexes are still anchored at the origin just before replication initiation.

== Role in cancer ==
Various MCMs have been shown to promote cell proliferation in vitro and in vivo especially in certain types of cancer cell lines. The association between MCMs and proliferation in cancer cell lines is mostly attributed to its ability to enhance DNA replication. The roles of MCM2 and MCM7 in cell proliferation have been demonstrated in various cellular contexts and even in human specimens.

MCM2 has been shown to be frequently expressed in proliferating premalignant lung cells. Its expression was associated with cells having a higher proliferation potential in non-dysplastic squamous epithelium, malignant fibrous histiocytomas, and endometrial carcinoma, while MCM2 expression was also correlated higher mitotic index in breast cancer specimens.

Similarly, many research studies have shown the link between MCM7 expression and cell proliferation. Expression of MCM7 was significantly correlated with the expression of Ki67 in choriocarcinomas, lung cancer, papillary urothelial neoplasia, esophageal cancer, and endometrial cancer. Its expression was also associated with a higher proliferative index in prostatic intraepithelial neoplasia and cancer.

== See also ==
- Human genes encoding MCM proteins include:
  - MCM2
  - MCM3
  - MCM4
  - MCM5
  - MCM6
  - MCM7
  - MCM8
  - MCM9
  - MCM10 (not part of the MCM family)
