= Cdc6 =

Protein in eukaryotic cells

Cell division protein Cdc6/18

Identifiers
- Symbol: Cdc6
- InterPro: IPR016314
Available protein structures:
- PDB: IPR016314
- AlphaFold: IPR016314

Orc1/Cdc6-type DNA replication protein, archaea
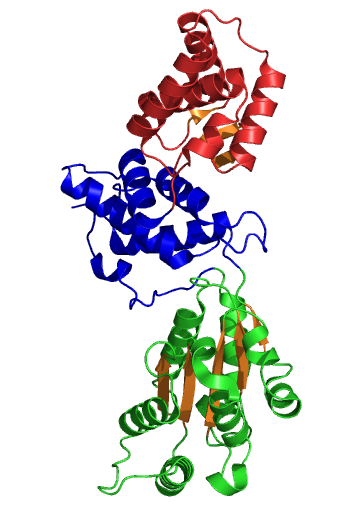
- Crystal Structure of CDC6 from P. aerophilum (PDB: 1FNN). Green and blue domains are AAA domains; red domain is the Cdc6 C-terminal HTH domain (infobox below).

Identifiers
- Symbol: Orc1/Cdc6_arc
- InterPro: IPR014277
Available protein structures:
- PDB: IPR014277
- AlphaFold: IPR014277

Cdc6/Orc1, C-terminal

Identifiers
- Symbol: Cdc6_C
- Pfam: PF09079
- InterPro: IPR015163
- CDD: cd08768
Available protein structures:
- PDB: IPR015163 PF09079 (ECOD; PDBsum)
- AlphaFold: IPR015163; PF09079

Cdc6, or cell division cycle 6, is a protein in eukaryotic cells. It is mainly studied in the budding yeast Saccharomyces cerevisiae (P09119). It is an essential regulator of DNA replication and plays important roles in the activation and maintenance of the checkpoint mechanisms in the cell cycle that coordinate S phase and mitosis. It is part of the pre-replicative complex (pre-RC) and is required for loading minichromosome maintenance (MCM) proteins onto the DNA, an essential step in the initiation of DNA synthesis. In addition, it is a member of the family of AAA+ ATPases and highly related to ORC1; both are the same protein in archaea.

Humans have only one gene coding for a Cdc6 protein: CDC6.

== Function ==
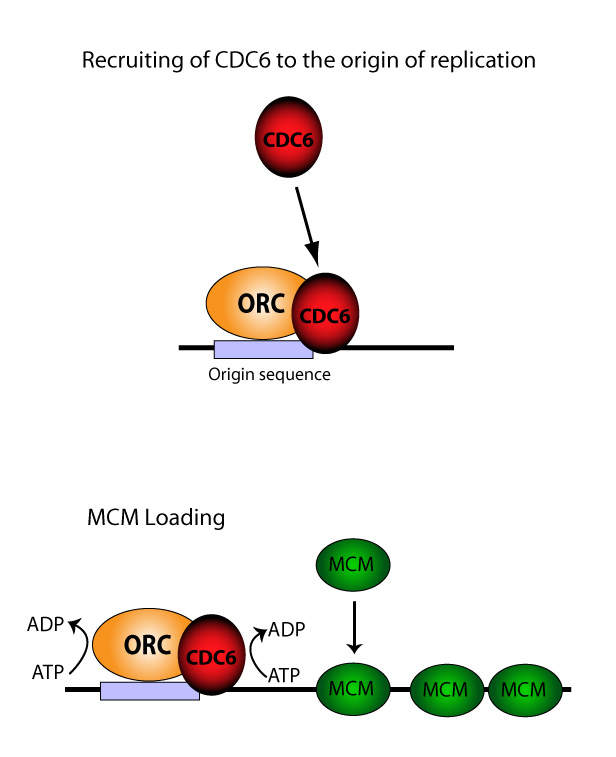
Potential role of Cdc6 at the initiation of DNA replication.

CDC6 is an ATP binding protein and a member of the pre-replicative complex (pre-RC) together with the origin recognition complex (ORC), Cdt1 and the MCM complex (containing MCM2-7p). CDC6 assembles after ORC in an ATP dependent manner and is required for loading MCM proteins onto the DNA. Reconstruction of electron microscope images showed that the ORC-CDC6 complex forms a ring-shaped structure with similar dimensions to those of ring-shaped MCM helicase. A near-atomic resolution model of the entire ORC-Cdc6-Cdt1-Mcm2-7 (OCCM) complex with DNA was assembled from EM data in 2017. It is thought that the CDC6-Cdt1 complex uses ATP hydrolysis to thread DNA through the central hole of the MCM doughnut. Mutations in the binding motif of CDC6 strongly suggest that ATP binding and hydrolysis is essential for its function. The minimal requirement for DNA binding has been mapped within its 47-amino acid sequence. Furthermore, Cdc6 indirectly inhibits activation of the p34cdc2/CDC28 M phase kinase, thus nuclear division is suppressed.

== Regulation ==
CDC6 is normally present at high levels during the G1 phase of the cell cycle. This is partly because the CDC6 gene is only transcribed during G1 phase. On the onset of the S phase, CDC6 gets phosphorylated by the Cdc28-Clb5-Clb6 complex (Cdk2) and consequently becoming inactivated. This has been shown by introducing mutations in CDC6 at the consensus sites for Cdk2 phosphorylation (near the N-terminus) which inhibit degradation. The phosphorylation can furthermore be catalyzed by Cdc28-Cln. The inactivated CDC6 is then targeted for degradation by SCFCDC4-dependent ubiquitinylation and afterwards degraded by the proteasome. Thus, the regulation of CDC6 is tightly correlated to the activity of Cdk2 and since Cdk2-activity is oscillating once per cell cycle, the accumulation and degradation of CDC6 also oscillates.

Two states can be distinguished. In the first state (during G1 phase) Cdk2-activity is low, CDC6 can accumulate, hence the pre-RC can be formed but not activated. In the second state Cdk2-activity is high, CDC6 becomes inactivated, hence the pre-RC is activated but not formed. This change assures that DNA replication is performed only once per cell cycle. It has been shown that overexpression of CDC6 does not induce re-replication in cognate cells, probably due to inhibition through CDK that resets the cell cycle clock to G1. Nevertheless, it has been suggested that regulation of CDC6 is one of several redundant mechanisms that prevent re-replication of the DNA in eukaryotic cells.

== Structure ==
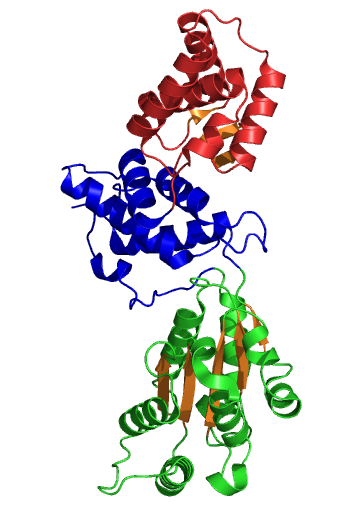
Crystal Structure of CDC6 from Pyrobaculum aerophilum. Domain I in green, domain II in blue and domain III in red. Beta-sheets are shown in orange.

The crystallographic structure of a Cdc6/Orc1-related protein from the archaeon Pyrobaculum aerophilum has been solved and three structural domains have been identified. Domain I and II form the ATP binding/hydrolysis site and are similar to other AAA+ ATPases. Domain III is structurally related to a winged-helix domain, thus may interact with origin DNA. From studies with E. coli γ clamp loading complex, it was suggested that domain III mediates protein-protein interactions with other AAA+ ATPases in the pre-RC, thus suggesting that the CDC6 builds a homodimer in its native form. The domains I and II form a cashew-shaped molecule that bind ATP in the cleft and additionally build the sensor motif for ATP/ADP recognition. These domains are also thought to mediate subsequent conformational changes. Nevertheless, the exact functional roles of these domains remain unclear.

== Disease ==
It has been shown CDC6 shows proto-oncogenic activity. Cdc6 overexpression interferes with the expression of INK4/ARF tumor suppressor genes through a mechanism involving the epigenetic modification of chromatin at the INK4/ARF locus. In addition, CDC6 overexpression in primary cells may promote DNA hyper-replication and induce a senescence response similar to that caused by oncogene activation. These findings indicate that deregulation of CDC6 expression in human cells poses a serious risk of carcinogenesis. Down-regulation of CDC6 in prostate cancer was observed and associated with phenotypic characteristics of aggressive prostate cancer. Furthermore, it has been observed that Cdc6 is greatly up-regulated in cervical cancer, lung cancer and brain cancer.
