= Replication fork trap =

DNA sequence system controlling chromosome replication

A replication fork trap is a DNA sequence system that helps control where DNA replication forks stop during chromosome replication. In Escherichia coli, the system is located in the chromosome's termination region. The replication fork trap was characterized through studies of E. coli in the late 1970s and 1980s, following the discovery of bidirectional DNA replication. These studies identified specific DNA sequences called Ter sites that interact with proteins to regulate replication fork movement. In E. coli, these termination sites function as part of a system in which the Tus protein binds to Ter DNA sequences. When Tus binds to a Ter site, the resulting Tus–Ter complex can act as a directional barrier to a replication fork which helps to make sure that replication ends at the right region of the chromosome.

== History ==
The replication fork trap was characterized in the late 1970s and 1980s, after bidirectional DNA replication was confirmed in 1972. While studying the terminus region of the Escherichia coli chromosome, Hill and Kuempel identified two termination sites, T1 and T2, located roughly opposite of origin of replication (oriC). Each site acts in a polar manner: it arrests a replication fork approaching from one direction while allowing a fork from the opposite direction to pass.

The following decades of research into the specifics of the replication fork trap led to the discoveries of unique proteins for both Bacillus subtilis and E. coli with no conservation between species, they are only similar in their role to terminate DNA replication. The protein used in E. coli is Tus, and it recognizes Ter sequences in the DNA. The protein present in B. subtilis is the replication terminator protein (RTP) and was later identified in 1989 after E. coli termination sites had been investigated. Because of two unrelated systems, experts believed these two species went through convergent evolution.

Comparative genome studies of species such as E. coli and Vibrio cholerae demonstrate a large difference in termination of DNA replication. V. cholerae do not have a termination proteins like Tus that is present in E. coli, instead this species just terminates its replication when the machinery meets in the middle. With this new discovery, it is believed that the genes for termination in E. coli and the tus gene were inherited from a plasmid instead of a common ancestor.

== Trap Replication Process in E. coli ==
E. coli has a unique trap replication process as it has 10 primary Ter sites (TerA-J) that contain distinct 23 base pair domains at the end of each chromosome called Ter DNA sequences on each chromosomal arm. The Tus protein binds to these sites, which halt replication forks approaching from a single direction. 5 of these primary Ter sites block parallel replication forks, and 5 block anti-parallel replication forks. Not all Ter sites in E. coli are equally as important, as some have a high affinity for Tus and stop replication and some cannot bind stably to ensure an effective fork arrest. Once Tus binds to a Ter site, DnaB helicase unwinds DNA as it approaches the Tus-Ter complex. Once DnaB helicase reaches the Tus-Ter complex, a cytosine base pair flips into the binding pocket on Tus, creating a Tus-Ter lock (TT-lock). This lock stops the replication fork.

Studies on E. coli show that TerC is the primary replication termination site, TerA and TerB significantly contribute, and that E. coli has several Ter sites to ensure backup barriers in case the replication fork breaks through the primary TerA, TerB, and TerC sites. Studies have proved that replication fork arrest at a Ter site is not always successful, promoting the need for backups.

== Trap Replication in Other Bacterial Species ==
Trap replication is used by many other bacterial species other than E. coli such as Bacillus subtilis. Both organisms use terminal replication sites to manage the movement of the replication fork but they rely on different proteins to make this happen. E. coli uses the Tus protein to bind to specific Ter sites whereas B. subtilis uses a replication terminator protein (RTP) to regulate the replication fork. Although the functions of these proteins have similar functions, the Tus and RTP have very little structural similarities showing how unique each mechanism in different bacterias species is, and how they have evolved independently of one another.
