= Primosome =

Protein complex

In molecular biology, a primosome is a protein complex responsible for creating RNA primers on single stranded DNA during DNA replication.

The primosome consists of seven proteins: DnaG primase, DnaB helicase, DnaC helicase assistant, DnaT, PriA, Pri B, and PriC. At each replication fork, the primosome is utilized once on the leading strand of DNA and repeatedly, initiating each Okazaki fragment, on the lagging DNA strand. Initially the complex formed by PriA, PriB, and PriC binds to DNA. Then the DnaB-DnaC helicase complex attaches along with DnaT. This structure is referred to as the pre-primosome. Finally, DnaG will bind to the pre-primosome forming a complete primosome. The primosome attaches 1-10 RNA nucleotides to the single stranded DNA creating a DNA-RNA hybrid. This sequence of RNA is used as a primer to initiate DNA polymerase III. The RNA bases are ultimately replaced with DNA bases by RNase H nuclease (eukaryotes) or DNA polymerase I nuclease (prokaryotes). DNA Ligase then acts to join the two ends together.

Assembly of the Escherichia coli primosome requires six proteins, PriA, PriB, PriC, DnaB, DnaC, and DnaT, acting at a primosome assembly site (pas) on an SSBcoated single-stranded (8s) DNA. Assembly is initiated by interactions of PriA and PriB with ssDNA and the pas. PriC, DnaB, DnaC, and DnaT then act on the PriAPriB- DNA complex to yield the primosome.

Primosomes are nucleoproteins assemblies that activate DNA replication forks. Their primary role is to recruit the replicative helicase onto single-stranded DNA. The "replication restart" primosome, defined in Escherichia coli, is involved in the reactivation of arrested replication forks. Binding of the PriA protein to forked DNA triggers its assembly. PriA is conserved in bacteria, but its primosomal partners are not. In Bacillus subtilis, genetic analysis has revealed three primosomal proteins, DnaB, DnaD, and DnaI, that have no obvious homologues in E. coli. They are involved in primosome function both at arrested replication forks and at the chromosomal origin. Our biochemical analysis of the DnaB and DnaD proteins unravels their role in primosome assembly. They are both multimeric and bind individually to DNA. Furthermore, DnaD stimulates DnaB binding activities. DnaD alone and the DnaD/DnaB pair interact specifically with PriA of B. subtilis on several DNA substrates. This suggests that the nucleoprotein assembly is sequential in the PriA, DnaD, DnaB order. The preferred DNA substrate mimics an arrested DNA replication fork with unreplicated lagging strand, structurally identical to a product of recombinational repair of a stalled replication fork.
