= DNA unwinding element =

Initiation site for the opening of the DNA double helix

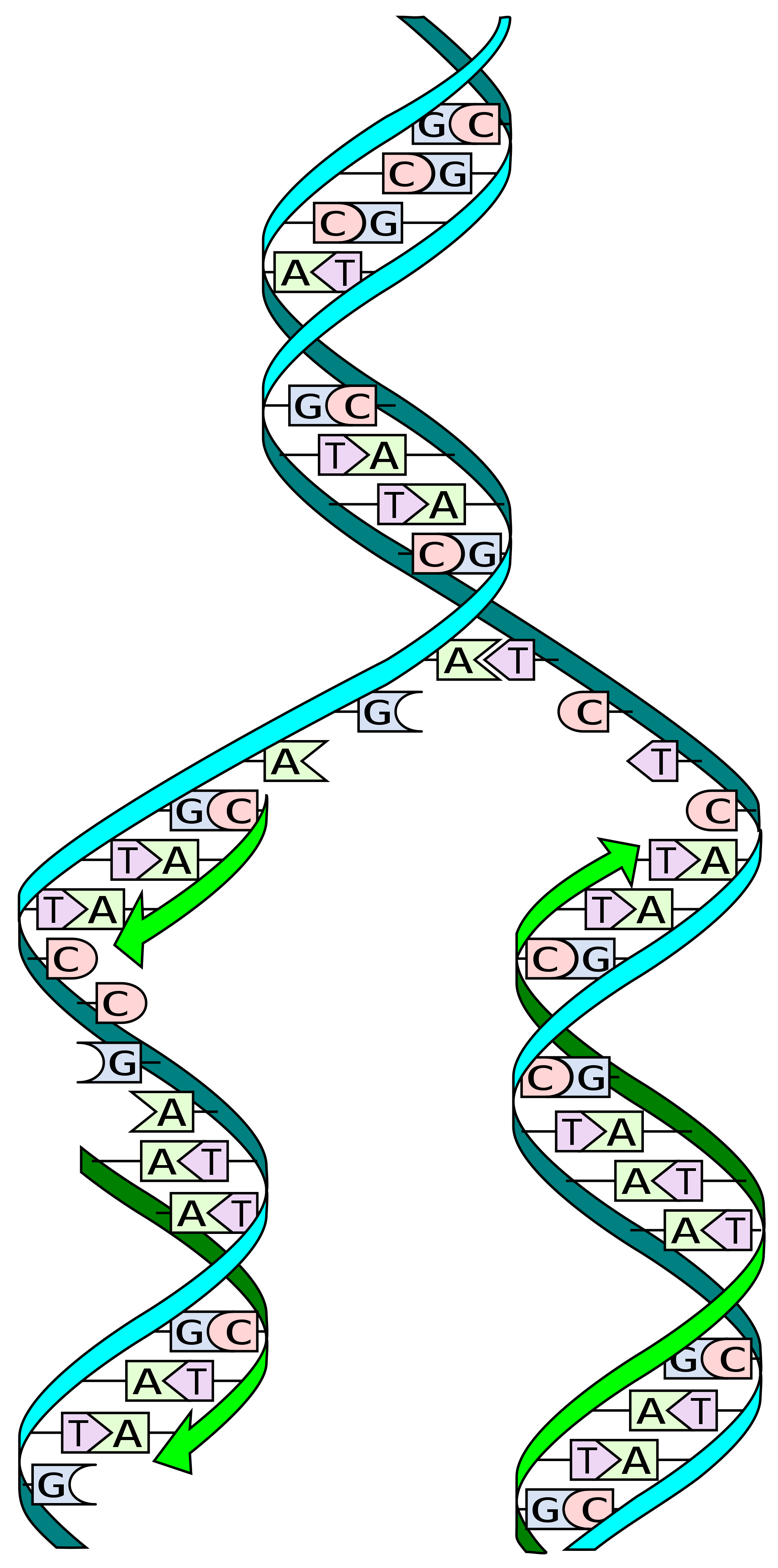
DNA unwinding at the DUE, allowing for formation of replication fork for DNA replication to occur.

A DNA unwinding element (DUE or DNAUE) is the initiation site for the opening of the double helix structure of the DNA at the origin of replication for DNA synthesis. It is A-T rich and denatures easily due to its low helical stability, which allows the single-strand region to be recognized by origin recognition complex.

DUEs are found in both prokaryotic and eukaryotic organisms, but were first discovered in yeast and bacteria origins, by D. Kowalski and M J Eddy. The DNA unwinding allows for access of replication machinery to the newly single strands. In eukaryotes, DUEs are the binding site for DNA-unwinding element binding (DUE-B) proteins required for replication initiation. In prokaryotes, DUEs are found in the form of tandem consensus sequences flanking the 5' end of DnaA binding domain. The act of unwinding at these A-T rich elements occurs even in absence of any origin binding proteins due to negative supercoiling forces, making it an energetically favourable action. DUEs are typically found spanning 30-100 bp of replication origins.

== Function ==
The specific unwinding of the DUE allows for initiation complex assembly at the site of replication on single-stranded DNA. The DNA helicase and associated enzymes are now able to bind to the unwound region, creating a replication fork start. The unwinding of this duplex strand region is associated with a low free energy requirement, due to helical instability caused by specific base-stacking interactions, in combination with counteracting supercoiling. Negative supercoiling allows the DNA to be stable upon melting, driven by reduction of torsional stress. Found in the replication origins of both bacteria and yeast, as well as present in some mammalian ones. Found to be between 30 and 100 bp long.

== Prokaryotes ==
In prokaryotes, most of the time DNA replication is occurring from one single replication origin on one single strand of DNA sequence. Whether this genome is linear or circularized, bacteria have own machinery necessary for replication to occur.

=== Process ===
In bacteria, the protein DnaA is the replication initiator. It gets loaded onto oriC at a DnaA box sequence where it binds and assembles filaments to open duplex and recruit DnaB helicase with the help of DnaC. DnaA is highly conserved and has two DNA binding domains. Just upstream to this DnaA box, is three tandem 13-mer sequences. These tandem sequences, labelled L, M, R from 5' to 3' are the bacterial DUEs. Two out of three of these A-T rich regions (M and R) become unwound upon binding of DnaA to DnaA box, via close proximity to unwinding duplex. The final 13-mer sequence L, farthest from this DnaA box eventually gets unwound upon DnaB helicase encircling it. This forms a replication bubble for DNA replication to then proceed.

Archaea use a simpler homolog of the eukaryotic origin recognition complex to find the origin of replication, at sequences termed the origin recognition box (ORB).

=== Favourability ===
Unwinding of these three DUEs is a necessary step for DNA replication to initiate. The distant pull from duplex melting at the DnaA box sequence is what induces further melting at the M and R DUE sites. The more distant L site is then unwound by DnaB binding. Unwinding of these 13-mer sites is independent of oriC-binding proteins. It is the generation of negative supercoiling that causes the unwinding.

The rates of DNA unwinding in the three E. coli DUEs were experimentally compared through nuclear resonance spectroscopy. In physiological conditions, the opening efficiency of each of the A-T rich sequences differed from one another. Largely due to the different distantly surrounding sequences.

Additionally, melting of AT/TA base pairs were found to be much faster than that of GC/CG pairs (15-240s^{−1} vs. ~20s^{−1}). This supports the idea that A-T sequences are evolutionarily favoured in DUE elements due to their ease of unwinding.

=== Consensus Sequence ===
The three 13-mer sequences identified as DUEs in E. coli, are well-conserved at the origin of replication of all documented enteric bacteria. A general consensus sequence was made via comparison of conserved bacteria to form an 11 base sequence, GATCTnTTnTTTT. E. coli contains 9 bases of the 11 base consensus sequence in its oriC, within the 13-mer sequences. These sequences are found exclusively at the single origin of replication; not anywhere else within the genome sequence.

== Eukaryotes ==
Eukaryotic replication mechanisms work in relatively similar ways to that of prokaryotes, but is under more finely-tuned regulation. There is a need to ensure that each DNA molecule is replicated only once and that this is occurring in the proper location at the proper time. Operates in response to extracellular signals that coordinate initiation of division, differently from tissue to tissue. External signals trigger replication in S phase via production of cyclins which activate cyclin-dependent kinases (CDK) to form complexes.

DNA replication in eukaryotes initiates upon origin recognition complex (ORC) binding to the origin. This occurs at G_{1} cell phase serving to drive the cell cycle forward into S phase. This binding allows for further factor binding to create a pre-replicative complex (pre-RC). Pre-RC triggered to initiate when cyclin-dependent kinase (CDK) and Dbf4-dependent kinase (DDK) bind to it. Initiation complexes then allow for recruitment of MCM helicase activator Cdc45 and subsequent unwinding of duplex at origin.

Replication in eukaryotes is initiated at multiple sites on the sequence, forming multiple replication forks simultaneously. This efficiency is required with the large genomes that they need to replicate.

In eukaryotes, nucleosome structures can complicate replication initiation. They can block access of DUE-B's to the DUE, thus suppressing transcription initiation. Can impede on rate. The linear nature of eukaryotic DNA, vs prokaryotic circular DNA, though, is easier to unwind its duplex once has been properly unwound from nucleosome. Activity of DUE can be modulated by transcription factors like ABF1.

=== Yeast ===
A common yeast model system that well-represents eukaryotic replication is Saccharomyces cerevisiae. It possesses autonomously replicating sequences (ARSs) that are transformed and maintained well in a plasmid. Some of these ARSs are seen to act as replication origins. These ARSs are composed of three domains A, B, and C. The A domain is where the ARS consensu s sequence resides, coined an ACS. The B domain contains the DUE. Lastly, the C domain is necessary for facilitating protein-protein interactions. ARSs are found distributed across 16 chromosomes, repeated every 30–40 kb.

Between species, these ARS sequences are variable, but their A, B, and C domains are well conserved. Any alterations in the DUE (domain B) causes lower overall function of the ARS as a whole in replication initiation. This was found via studies using imino exchange and NMR spectroscopy.

=== Mammals ===
DUEs found in some mammalian replication origins to date. In general, very little mammalian origins of replication have been well-analyzed, so difficult to determine how prevalent the DUEs are, in their defined replication origins.

Human cells still have very little detailing of their origins. It is known that replication initiates in large initiation zone areas, associated with known proteins like the c-myc and β-globin gene. Ones with DUEs thought to act in nearly same way as yeast cells.

DUE in origin of plasmids in mammalian cells, SV40, found to be associated with a T-ag hexamer, that introduces opposite supercoiling to increase favourability of strand unwinding.

Mammals with DUEs have shown evidence of structure-forming abilities that provide single-stranded stability of unwound DNA. These include cruciforms, intramolecular triplexes, and more.

== DUE-binding proteins ==
DNA unwinding element proteins (DUE-Bs) are found in eukaryotes.

They act to initiate strand separation by binding to DUE. DUE-B sequence homologs found among a variety of animal species- fish, amphibians, and rodents. DUE-B's have disordered C-terminal domains that bind to the DUE by recognition of this C-terminus. No other sequence specificity involved in this interaction. Confirmed by inducing mutations along length of DUE-B sequence, but in all cases dimerization abilities remaining intact. Upon binding DNA, C-terminus becomes ordered, imparting a greater stability against protease degradation. DUE-B's are 209 residues in total, 58 of which are disordered until bound to DUE. DUE-B's hydrolyze ATP In order to function. Also possess similar sequence to aminoacyl-tRNA synthetase, and were previously classified a such. DUE-Bs form homodimers that create an extended beta-sheet secondary structure extending across it. Two of these homodimers come together to form the overall asymmetric DUE-B structure.

In formation of the pre-RC, Cdc45 is localized to the DUE for activity via interaction with a DUE-B. Allowing for duplex unwinding and replication initiation.

In humans, DUE-B's are 60 amino acids longer than its yeast ortholog counterparts. Both localized mainly in the nucleus.

DUE-B levels are in consistent quantity, regardless of cell cycle. In S phase though, DUE-Bs can be temporarily phosphorylated to prevent premature replication. DUE-B activity is covalently controlled. The assembly of these DUE-Bs at the DUE regions is dependent on local kinase and phosphatase activity. DUE-B's can also be down-regulated by siRNAs and have been implicated in extended G1 stages.

== Mutation Implications ==
Mutations that impair the unwinding at DUE sites directly impede DNA replication activity. This can be a result of deletions/changes in the DUE region, the addition of reactive reagents, or the addition of specific nuclease. DUE sites are relatively insensitive to point mutations though, maintaining their activity in when altering bases in protein binding sites. In many cases, DUE activity can be partially regained by increasing temperature. Can be regained by the re-addition of DUE site as well.

If there is a severe enough mutation to DUE causing it to no longer be bound to DUE-B, Cdc45 cannot associate and will not bind to c-myc transcription factor. This can be recovered in disease-related (ATTCT)(n) length expansions of the DUE sequence. If DUE activity regained in excess, could cause dysregulated origin formation and cell cycle progression.

In eukaryotes, when DUE-B's are knocked out, the cell will not go into S phase of its cycle, where DNA replication occurs. Increased apoptosis will result. But, activity can be rescued by re-addition of the DUE-B's, even from a different species. This is because DUE-B's are homologous between species. For example, if DUE-B in Xenopus egg are mutated, no DNA replication will occur, but can be saved by addition of HeLa DUE-B's to regain full functionality.
