= Prokaryotic DNA replication =

DNA replication in prokaryotes

Prokaryotic DNA replication is the process by which a prokaryote duplicates its DNA into another copy that is passed on to daughter cells. Although it is often studied in the model organism E. coli, other bacteria show many similarities. Replication is bi-directional and originates at a single origin of replication (OriC). It consists of three steps: Initiation, elongation, and termination.

Bidirectional Theta type replication. Most circular bacterial chromosomes are replicated bidirectionally, starting at one point of origin and replicating in two directions away from the origin. This results in semiconservative replication, in which each new identical DNA molecule contains one template strand from the original molecule, shown as the solid lines, and one new strand, shown as the dotted lines.

== Initiation ==
All cells must finish DNA replication before they can proceed for cell division. Media conditions that support fast growth in bacteria also couples with shorter inter-initiation time in them, i.e. the doubling time in fast growing cells is less as compared to the slow growth. In other words, it is possible that in fast growth conditions the grandmother cells starts replicating its DNA for grand daughter cell. For the same reason, the initiation of DNA replication is highly regulated. Bacterial origins regulate orisome assembly, a nuclei-protein complex assembled on the origin responsible for unwinding the origin and loading all the replication machinery. In E. coli, the direction for orisome assembly are built into a short stretch of nucleotide sequence called as origin of replication (oriC) which contains multiple binding sites for the initiator protein DnaA (a highly homologous protein amongst bacterial kingdom). DnaA has four domains with each domain responsible for a specific task. There are 11 DnaA binding sites/boxes on the E. coli origin of replication out of which three boxes R1, R2 and R4 (which have a highly conserved 9 bp consensus sequence 5' - TTATC/ACACA) are high affinity DnaA boxes. They bind to DnaA-ADP and DnaA-ATP with equal affinities and are bound by DnaA throughout most of the cell cycle and forms a scaffold on which rest of the orisome assembles. The rest eight DnaA boxes are low affinity sites that preferentially bind to DnaA-ATP. During initiation, DnaA bound to high affinity DnaA box R4 donates additional DnaA to the adjacent low affinity site and progressively fill all the low affinity DnaA boxes. Filling of the sites changes origin conformation from its native state. It is hypothesized that DNA stretching by DnaA bound to the origin promotes strand separation which allows more DnaA to bind to the unwound region. The DnaC helicase loader then interacts with the DnaA bound to the single-stranded DNA to recruit the DnaB helicase, which will continue to unwind the DNA as the DnaG primase lays down an RNA primer and DNA Polymerase III holoenzyme begins elongation.

=== Regulation ===
Chromosome replication in bacteria is regulated at the initiation stage. DnaA-ATP is hydrolyzed into the inactive DnaA-ADP by RIDA (Regulatory Inactivation of DnaA), and converted back to the active DnaA-ATP form by DARS (DnaA Reactivating Sequence, which is itself regulated by Fis and IHF). However, the main source of DnaA-ATP is synthesis of new molecules. Meanwhile, several other proteins interact directly with the oriC sequence to regulate initiation, usually by inhibition. In E. coli these proteins include DiaA, SeqA, IciA, HU, and ArcA-P, but they vary across other bacterial species. A few other mechanisms in E. coli that variously regulate initiation are DDAH (datA-Dependent DnaA Hydrolysis, which is also regulated by IHF), inhibition of the dnaA gene (by the SeqA protein), and reactivation of DnaA by the lipid membrane.

== Elongation ==
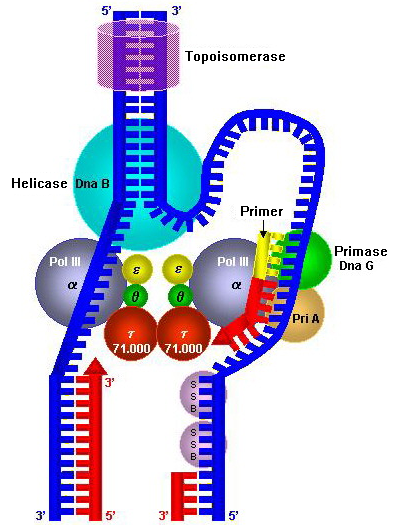
E coli replisome with a loop in lagging strand DNA

Once priming is complete, DNA polymerase III holoenzyme is loaded into the DNA and replication begins. The catalytic mechanism of DNA polymerase III involves the use of two metal ions in the active site, and a region in the active site that can discriminate between deoxyribonucleotides and ribonucleotides. The metal ions are general divalent cations that help the 3' OH initiate a nucleophilic attack onto the alpha phosphate of the deoxyribonucleotide and orient and stabilize the negatively charged triphosphate on the deoxyribonucleotide. Nucleophilic attack by the 3' OH on the alpha phosphate releases pyrophosphate, which is then subsequently hydrolyzed (by inorganic phosphatase) into two phosphates. This hydrolysis drives DNA synthesis to completion.

Furthermore, DNA polymerase III must be able to distinguish between correctly paired bases and incorrectly paired bases. This is accomplished by distinguishing Watson-Crick base pairs through the use of an active site pocket that is complementary in shape to the structure of correctly paired nucleotides. This pocket has a tyrosine residue that is able to form van der Waals interactions with the correctly paired nucleotide. In addition, dsDNA (double-stranded DNA) in the active site has a wider major groove and shallower minor groove that permits the formation of hydrogen bonds with the third nitrogen of purine bases and the second oxygen of pyrimidine bases. Finally, the active site makes extensive hydrogen bonds with the DNA backbone. These interactions result in the DNA polymerase III closing around a correctly paired base. If a base is inserted and incorrectly paired, these interactions could not occur due to disruptions in hydrogen bonding and van der Waals interactions.

DNA is read in the 3' → 5' direction, therefore, nucleotides are synthesized (or attached to the template strand) in the 5' → 3' direction. However, one of the parent strands of DNA is 3' → 5' while the other is 5' → 3'. To solve this, replication occurs in opposite directions. Heading towards the replication fork, the leading strand is synthesized in a continuous fashion, only requiring one primer. On the other hand, the lagging strand, heading away from the replication fork, is synthesized in a series of short fragments known as Okazaki fragments, consequently requiring many primers. The RNA primers of Okazaki fragments are subsequently degraded by RNase H and DNA Polymerase I (exonuclease), and the gaps (or nicks) are filled with deoxyribonucleotides and sealed by the enzyme ligase.

=== Rate of replication ===
The rate of DNA replication in a living cell was first measured as the rate of phage T4 DNA elongation in phage-infected E. coli. During the period of exponential DNA increase at 37 °C, the rate was 749 nucleotides per second. The mutation rate per base pair per replication during phage T4 DNA synthesis is 1.7 per 10^{8}.

== Termination ==
Termination of DNA replication in E. coli is completed through the use of termination sequences and the Tus protein. These sequences allow the two replication forks to pass through in only one direction, but not the other.

DNA replication initially produces two catenated or linked circular DNA duplexes, each comprising one parental strand and one newly synthesised strand (by nature of semiconservative replication). This catenation can be visualised as two interlinked rings which cannot be separated. Topoisomerase 2 in E. coli unlinks or decatenates the two circular DNA duplexes by breaking the phosphodiester bonds present in two successive nucleotides of either parent DNA or newly formed DNA and thereafter the ligating activity ligates that broken DNA strand and so the two DNA get formed.

== Other prokaryotic replication models ==
=== Rolling circle replication ===
Rolling circle replication is seen in bacterial conjugation where the same circulartemplate DNA rotates and around it the new strand develops.

Rolling circle replication

When conjugation is initiated by a signal, the relaxase enzyme creates a nick in one of the strands of the conjugative plasmid at the oriT. Relaxase may work alone or in a complex of over a dozen proteins known collectively as a relaxosome. In the F-plasmid system the relaxase enzyme is called TraI and the relaxosome consists of TraI, TraY, TraM and the integrated host factor IHF. The nicked strand, or T-strand, is then unwound from the unbroken strand and transferred to the recipient cell in a 5'-terminus to 3'-terminus direction. The remaining strand is replicated either independent of conjugative action (vegetative replication beginning at the oriV) or in concert with conjugation (conjugative replication similar to the rolling circle replication of lambda phage). Conjugative replication may require a second nick before successful transfer can occur. A recent report claims to have inhibited conjugation with chemicals that mimic an intermediate step of this second nicking event.

=== D-loop replication ===
D-loop replication is mostly seen in organellar DNA, where a triple-stranded displacement loop is formed.
