= HspQ protein domain =

Region of a protein's polypeptide chain

HspQ (YccV-like) protein domain
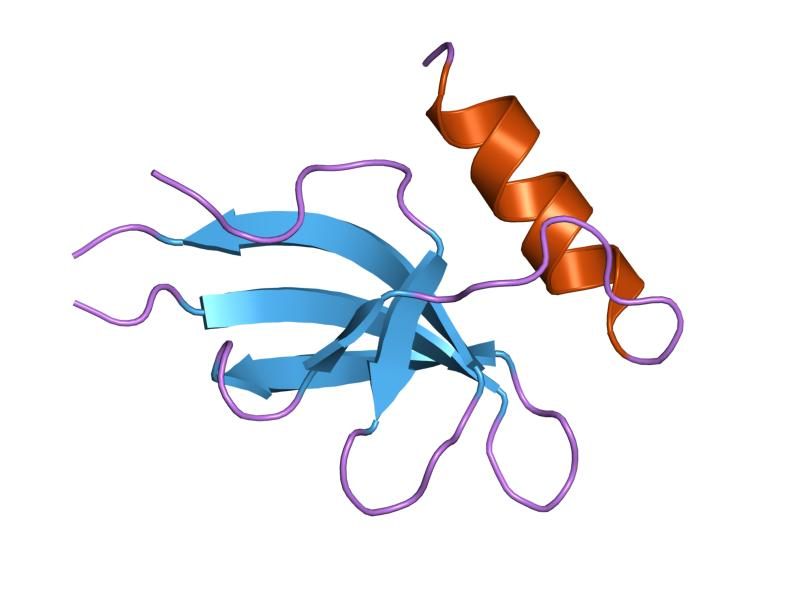
- Crystal structure of hypothetical protein from Escherichia coli

Identifiers
- Symbol: YccV-like
- Pfam: PF08755
- InterPro: IPR011722
Available protein structures:
- Pfam: structures / ECOD
- PDB: RCSB PDB; PDBe; PDBj
- PDBsum: structure summary

In molecular biology, YccV protein domain is also, alternatively named, Heat shock protein HspQ. This entry describes the small protein from Escherichia coli YccV and its homologs in other Pseudomonadota. YccV is now described as a hemimethylated DNA binding protein. The model entry describes a protein domain in longer eukaryotic proteins.

== Function ==
HspQ is involved in the degradation of certain denaturated proteins, including DnaA, during Heat shock stress. HspQ (YccV like protein domain) is a hemimethylated DNA-binding protein. It has been thought to negatively regulate dnaA gene expression when its promoter region is either methylated or hemimethylated. This could occurs through binding of YccV itself to fully or hemimethylated DNA. In addition, studies have identified the yccV gene as one of three insertion sites in mini-Tn10 which suppress dnaA46 thermosensitivity.

== Structure ==
This protein domain is thought to have a SH3-like barrel structure. Additionally, the structure of a hypothetical protein in this family has been solved and it forms a beta sheet structure with a terminating alpha helix. HspQ forms a stable homodimer in solution and can form homomultimers consisting of about four monomers. The theoretical molecular mass of the HspQ protein were calculated to be 11.8 kDa. It is putatively thought that HspQ requires a cofactor to form a functional hetero-oligomeric complex.
