= DnaI =

Primosomal protein DnaI

Identifiers
- Symbol: dnaI

DnaI is a protein that is part of the primosome involved in prokaryotic DNA replication. In Bacillus subtilis, genetic analysis has revealed three primosomal proteins, DnaB, DnaD, and DnaI, that have no obvious homologues in E. coli. They are involved in primosome function both at arrested replication forks and at the chromosomal origin.
