= DnaD =

DNA replication protein DnaD

Identifiers
- Organism: Bacillus subtilis (strain 168)
- Symbol: dnaD
- Entrez: 939040
- Orthologs: NCBI: entry; OMA: entry
- RefSeq (Prot): NP_390116.1
- UniProt: P39787

Other data
- Chromosome: genomic: 2.35 - 2.35 Mb
Search for
- Structures: Swiss-model
- Domains: InterPro

DnaD is a 232 amino acid long protein that is part of the primosome involved in prokaryotic DNA replication. In Bacillus subtilis, genetic analysis has revealed three primosomal proteins, DnaB, DnaD, and DnaI, that have no obvious homologues in E. coli. They are involved in primosome function both at arrested replication forks and at the chromosomal origin.

DnaB and DnaD proteins are both multimeric and bind individually to DNA. DnaD induces DnaB to bind. DnaD alone and the DnaD/DnaB complex then interact with PriA of Bacillus subtilis at several DNA sites. This suggests that the nucleoprotein assembly is sequential in the PriA, DnaD, DnaB order.
