= Gua Operon =

The gua operon is responsible for regulating the synthesis of guanosine mono phosphate (GMP), a purine nucleotide, from inosine monophosphate (IMP or inosinate). It consists of two structural genes guaB (encodes for IMP dehydrogenase or and guaA (encodes for GMP synthetase) apart from the promoter and operator region.

== Purine biosynthesis ==
The first committed step of purine biosynthesis starts from 5-phosphoribosyl 1 pyrophosphate. This undergoes a series of reactions to form IMP, an important branch point in the pathway. The pathway then branches to form adenylosuccinate and then adenylate (AMP) in one branch and xanthylate (XMP) and then guanylate (GMP) in the other branch. IMP dehydrogenase catalyses the conversion of IMP to XMP and GMP synthetase catalyses the conversion of XMP to GMP.

== Regulation ==
The operon must respond to changes in the metabolic state of the cell. It is subject to growth rate dependent control, stringent control (control during the various stresses the cell is exposed to) and other forms of control. Hence it stops biosynthesis if guanine can be obtained from the external medium, increases its expression if nucleotides are needed (for example during DNA replication) and balances the production of GMP with respect to AMP and the pyrimidine nucleotides. The branch point at IMP mentioned above is tightly controlled rigid node so as to have a balanced production of AMP and GMP. The gua operon is repressed by GMP and is induced by AMP. Similarly AMP synthesis is repressed by AMP itself while it is activated by GMP. This dual control ensures that there is a balance of flux between AMP and GMP and the flux partition remains relatively constant even in the face of perturbations. Some mechanisms by which this control is achieved are discussed below.

The branch point at IMP is a rigid node where the product of one branch represses its formation and induces the formation of the product of the other branch

=== Some mechanisms of regulation of the gua operon ===
Since DNA replication needs a supply of guanine nucleotides, there must be some co-ordination between the DNA replication machinery and the gua operon. One method through which this happens is the DnaA protein. DnaA is a protein which recognises the origin of replication, promotes a local unwinding of an AT rich DNA region and finally guides the helicase DnaB to its entry site. DnaA is the replication initiation factor which causes DNA replication if present in sufficient concentration.

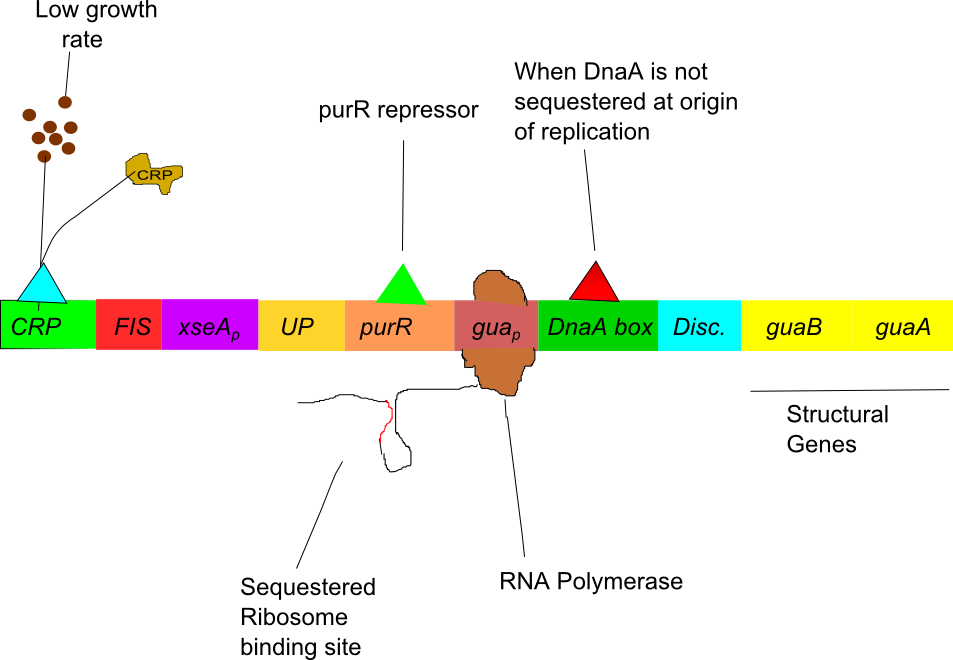
Regulation of the Gua Operon

When replication happens, the origin of replication creates a "sink" for DnaA proteins. So genes which are negatively modulated by DnaA, like those of the gua operon are derepressed. Two potential DnaA binding sites, one on the gua promoter and another 200 bp downstream of the IMP dehydrogenase initiation codon on the guaB gene exist. It is thought that both the former and the latter sequences play a part, the latter part being vital and DNA binding at these sequences negatively affect transcription of the gene.

While growing on media in which growth rates are low, cAMP binds to a cAMP receptor protein forming a complex which has regulatory properties. This complex binds to a region 100 bp upstream of the guaB transcription start site which then represses the gua operon. It is a matter of debate of how this complex interacts with RNA polymerase from as long as around 100 bit/s away. One view suggests the involvement of an unknown regulatory factor. In any case, the complex confers growth rate dependent control to the promoter region of the operon.

The repressor purR encoded by purR genes controls the synthesis of enzymes involved in purine biosynthesis. A putative 16 bp pur operator was found in the gua promoter. The purR repressor works with other co-repressors, for example guanine which is a co-repressor in E. coli.

The gua mRNA leader has the potential for forming a stable stem-loop secondary structure incorporating the first 37 nucleotides of the transcript. As the ribosome binding site is sequestered in the stem loop, this structure may be involved in translational regulation.

The gua promoter lies back-to-back with the xseA promoter (encoding the mismatch repair enzyme exonuclease VII). Such close spacing of promoters may have regulatory significance and will lead to steric hindrance as the RNA polymerase molecules try to bind simultaneously. Inactivation of one promoter will naturally lead to greater expression of the other promoter. Other mechanisms include FIS (factor for inversion stimulation) which sterically hinders RNA polymerase binding. But the role of FIS is not yet properly investigated.

== Homologues in eukaryotes ==
Since the metabolic pathway is conserved across species, the genes are similar too. Extensive studies on the regulation in Saccharomyces cerevisiae have been done. The IMD family of genes and gua1 in yeast correspond to guaB and guaA. Here only IMD genes are guanine sensitive and not gua1 unlike in prokaryotes where the entire operon is sensitive. Mycophenolic acid, a drug which is an inhibitor of IMP dehydrogenase, is an inducer of IMD 2 gene (and hence IMD 2 probably has intrinsic drug activity. Another aspect in which the eukaryotic regulation is very different is that eukaryotes have differential regulation of the branches leading to AMP and GMP. For example, in yeasts AMP synthesis genes are poorly repressed by guanine whereas GMP synthesis genes are not affected by adenine and in humans IMP dehydrogenase synthesis is repressed in the presence of guanosine but not adenosine.
