= DNAA =

DNAA may refer to:

- DnaA, protein that activates initiation of DNA replication in bacteria
- Nnamdi Azikiwe International Airport, Abuja, FCT, Nigeria (ICAO: DNAA)
- Driffield Navigation Amenities Association, an organisation formed in 1968 to restore the Driffield Navigation waterway
- Discharge not amounting to an acquittal, a type of discharge in Malaysian criminal procedure
