= Replication terminator Tus family =

Ter
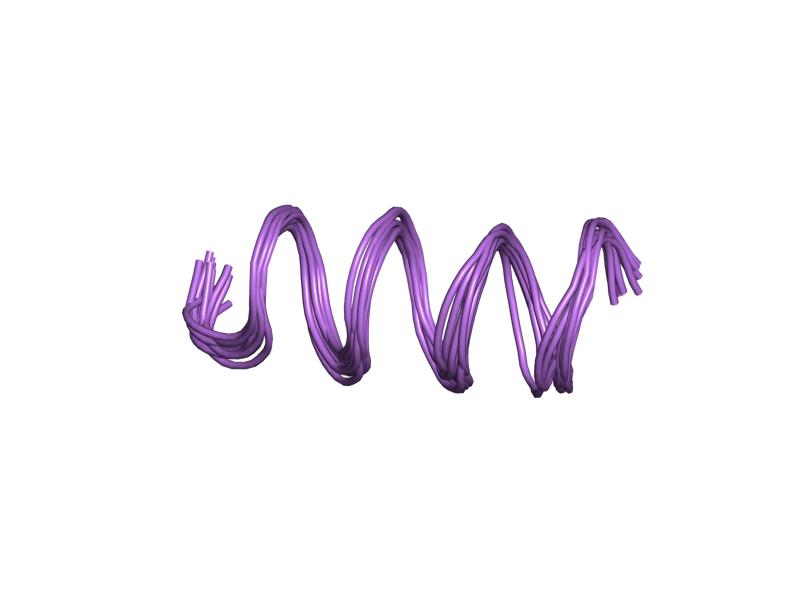
- Nmr study of the proline repeat from tus

Identifiers
- Symbol: Ter
- Pfam: PF05472
- InterPro: IPR008865
- SCOP2: 5eau / SCOPe / SUPFAM
Available protein structures:
- Pfam: structures / ECOD
- PDB: RCSB PDB; PDBe; PDBj
- PDBsum: structure summary

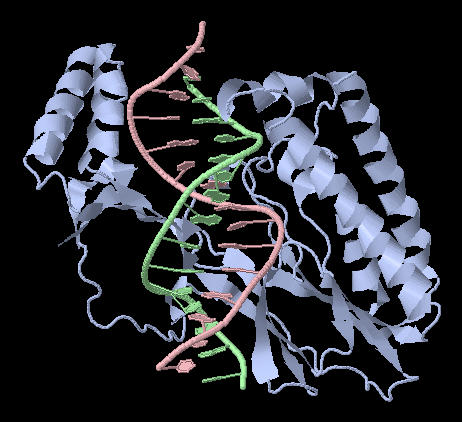
Representation of the x-ray crystal structure of Tus-Ter protein-DNA complex. (Jmol rendering of coordinates from. The DNA strands are shown in pink and green.)

Tus (terminus utilization substance), also known as a ter-binding protein, is a protein that binds to terminator sequences and acts as a counter-helicase when it comes in contact with an advancing helicase. The bound Tus protein effectively halts DNA polymerase movement. Tus helps end DNA replication in prokaryotes. They function by binding to DNA replication terminator sequences, thus preventing the passage of replication forks. The termination efficiency is affected by the affinity of a particular protein for the terminator sequence.

In E. coli (P16525), Tus binds to 10 closely related sites encoded in the chromosome, although only 6 are likely to be involved in replication termination. Each site is 23 base pairs. The sites are called Ter sites, and are designated TerA, TerB, ..., TerG. These binding sites are asymmetric, such that when a Tus-Ter complex (Tus protein bound to a Ter site) is encountered by a replication fork from one direction, the complex is dissociated and replication continues (permissive). But when encountered from the other direction, the Tus-Ter complex provides a much larger kinetic barrier and halts replication (non-permissive). The multiple Ter sites in the chromosome are oriented such that the two oppositely moving replication forks are both stalled in the desired termination region.

Bacillus subtilis utilize replication terminator protein (RTP) instead of Tus. This is a different protein family using a different structure to bind to DNA: InterPro: IPR003432.

== Structure ==
The Ter protein contains two domains. The N-terminal domain is composed of an alpha helices, beta sheet, and three loops. The C-terminal domain is made of two alpha helices and one beta sheet. Alternatively, CATH divides the structure into a big domain spanning the entire sequence and a small insertion that pops out and folds as a separate domain.

== Function ==
A DNA replication terminus (Ter) has a role in preventing progress of the DNA replication fork. Therefore, a DNA replication terminus site-binding protein binds to this site helping to block the DNA replication fork. There are two genes controlling Ter-binding activity, named tau and Tus.
