= 2-iminobutanoate/2-iminopropanoate deaminase =

Protein-coding gene in the species Homo sapiens

RIDA
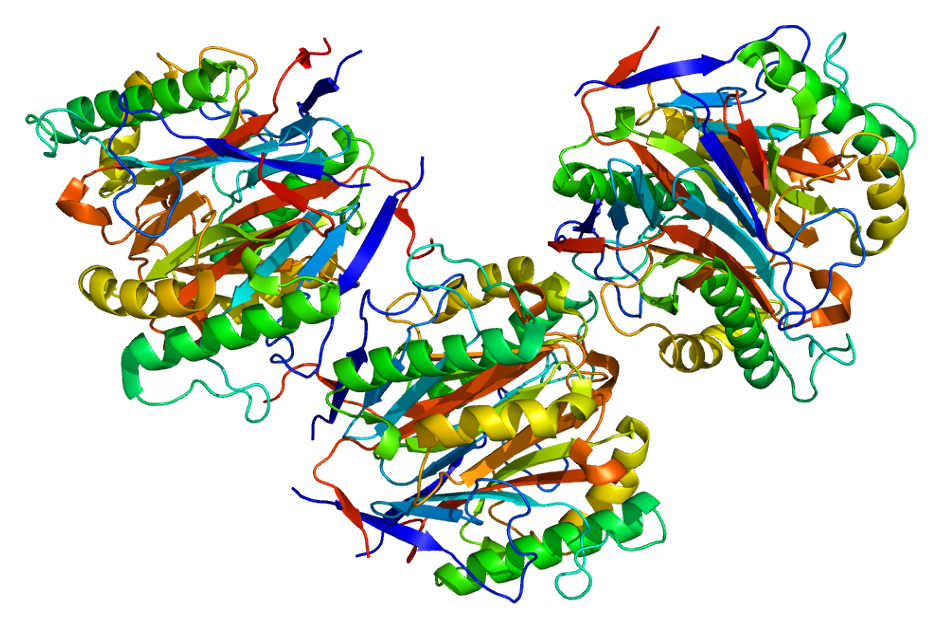

Identifiers
- Aliases: RIDA, P14.5, PSP, UK114, HRSP12, Heat-responsive protein 12, reactive intermediate imine deaminase A homolog, hp14.5
- External IDs: OMIM: 602487; MGI: 1095401; GeneCards: RIDA
Available structures
PDB	Ortholog search: PDBe RCSB
PDB	List of PDB id codes 1ONI
Enzyme activity
EC #	BRENDA	ExPASy	KEGG	MetaCyc
3.5.99.10	↗	↗	↗	↗

Gene location (Human)
Chr.	Chromosome 8 (human)
Band	8q22.2	Start	98,102,344 bp
Band	8q22.2	End	98,117,171 bp

Gene location (Mouse)
Chr.	Chromosome 15 (mouse)
Band	15|15 B3.1	Start	34,484,167 bp
Band	15|15 B3.1	End	34,495,401 bp
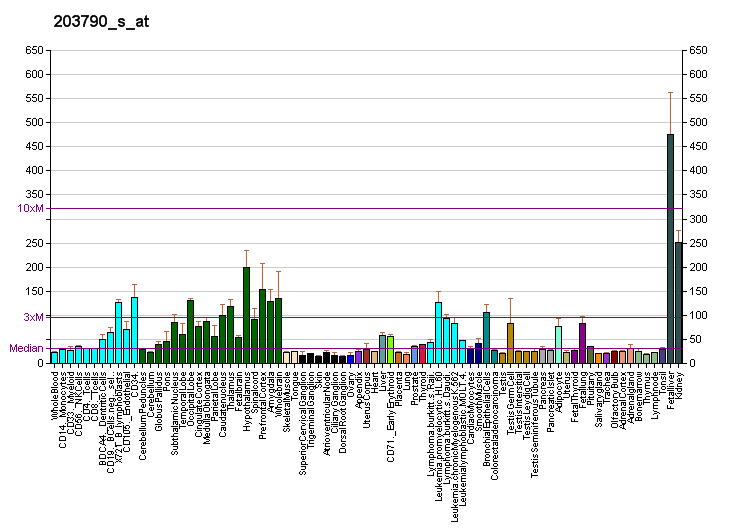
RNA expression pattern
Bgee	Human / Mouse (ortholog); Top expressed in: right lobe of liver; kidney tubule; caudate nucleus; nucleus accumbens; putamen; amygdala; glomerulus; human kidney; anterior cingulate cortex; right adrenal cortex / Top expressed in: right kidney; human kidney; left lobe of liver; proximal tubule; yolk sac; Epithelium of choroid plexus; deep cerebellar nuclei; cerebellar cortex; vestibular sensory epithelium; vestibular membrane of cochlear duct; More reference expression data
BioGPS	More reference expression data
Gene ontology
Molecular function	protein homodimerization activity; ion binding; long-chain fatty acid binding; transition metal ion binding; hydrolase activity; RNA binding; deaminase activity; endoribonuclease activity, producing 3'-phosphomonoesters
Cellular component	cytosol; mitochondrion; extracellular exosome; nucleus; cytoplasm; mitochondrial matrix; peroxisome
Biological process	kidney development; lung development; G1 to G0 transition; response to lipid; brain development; response to salt; negative regulation of epithelial cell proliferation; RNA phosphodiester bond hydrolysis, endonucleolytic; organonitrogen compound catabolic process; negative regulation of translation; L-threonine catabolic process to glycine
Sources:Amigo / QuickGO
Orthologs
Databases	NCBI: entry; OMA: entry
Species	Human	Mouse
Entrez	10247	15473
Ensembl	ENSG00000132541	ENSMUSG00000022323
UniProt	P52758	P52760
RefSeq (mRNA)	NM_005836	NM_008287
RefSeq (protein)	NP_005827	NP_032313
Location (UCSC)	Chr 8: 98.1 – 98.12 Mb	Chr 15: 34.48 – 34.5 Mb
PubMed search
- Wikidata
View/Edit Human	View/Edit Mouse

2-iminobutanoate/2-iminopropanoate deaminase is an enzyme that in humans is encoded by the RIDA gene. RIDA is also known as Heat-responsive protein 12 (HRSP12), Ribonuclease UK114, or reactive intermediate imine deaminase A.

It catalyses two related hydrolysis reactions which also occur spontaneously but are accelerated to avoid the damage which the reactive imines might cause to an organism. For example, 2-iminobutanoic acid is converted to α-ketobutyric acid and ammonia:

2-iminobutanoic acid
H_{2}O
NH_{3}
α-ketobutyric acid

The imine is a byproduct of pyridoxal phosphate-dependent enzymes that are widespread in nature. The enzyme also converts 2-iminopropanoic acid to pyruvic acid.
