= DnaA =

Protein

Chromosomal replication initiator protein dnaA

Identifiers
- Organism: Escherichia coli (str. K-12 substr. MG1655)
- Symbol: DnaA
- Entrez: 948217
- Orthologs: NCBI: entry; OMA: entry
- RefSeq (Prot): NP_418157.1
- UniProt: P03004

Other data
- Chromosome: genome: 3.88 - 3.88 Mb
Search for
- Structures: Swiss-model
- Domains: InterPro

Bac_DnaA_C
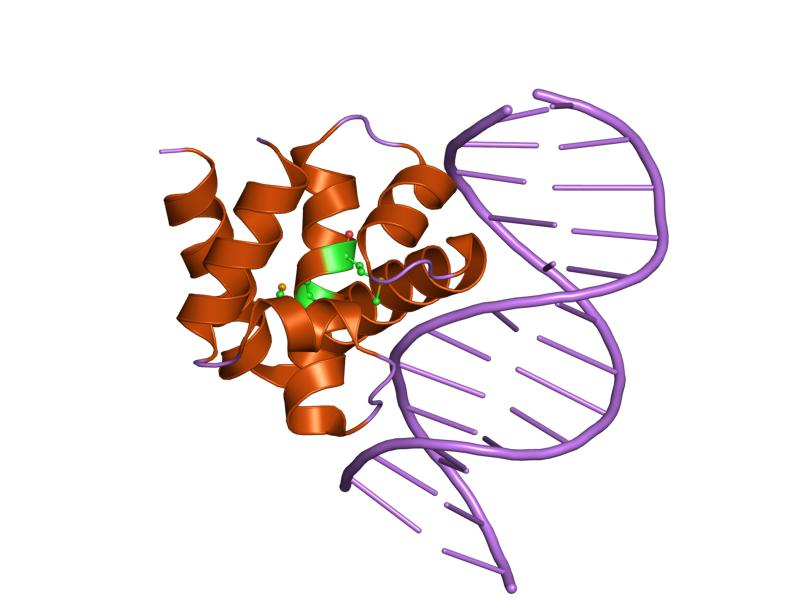
- crystal structure of dnaa domainiv complexed with dnaabox dna

Identifiers
- Symbol: Bac_DnaA_C
- Pfam: PF08299
- Pfam clan: CL0123
- InterPro: IPR013159
- SCOP2: 1j1v / SCOPe / SUPFAM
Available protein structures:
- PDB: IPR013159 PF08299 (ECOD; PDBsum)
- AlphaFold: IPR013159; PF08299

DnaA is a protein that activates initiation of DNA replication in bacteria. Based on the Replicon Model, a positively active initiator molecule contacts with a particular spot on a circular chromosome called the replicator to start DNA replication. It is a replication initiation factor which promotes the unwinding of DNA at oriC. The DnaA proteins found in all bacteria engage with the DnaA boxes to start chromosomal replication. The onset of the initiation phase of DNA replication is determined by the concentration of DnaA. DnaA accumulates during growth and then triggers the initiation of replication. Replication begins with active DnaA binding to 9-mer (9-bp) repeats upstream of oriC. Binding of DnaA leads to strand separation at the 13-mer repeats. This binding causes the DNA to loop in preparation for melting open by the helicase DnaB.

Bac_DnaA
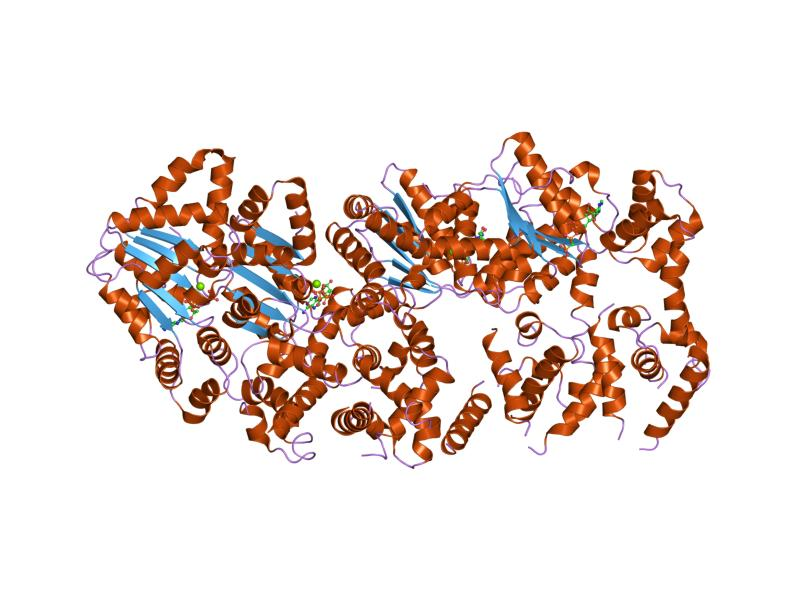
- structure of amppcp-bound dnaa from aquifex aeolicus

Identifiers
- Symbol: Bac_DnaA
- Pfam: PF00308
- Pfam clan: CL0023
- InterPro: IPR013317
- PROSITE: PDOC00771
- SCOP2: 1j1v / SCOPe / SUPFAM
Available protein structures:
- PDB: IPR013317 PF00308 (ECOD; PDBsum)
- AlphaFold: IPR013317; PF00308

== Function ==
DnaA consists mainly in two different forms, the active ATP-form and the inactive ADP. The level of active DnaA within a cell is low immediately after a cell has divided. Although the active form of DnaA requires ATP, the formation of the oriC/DnaA complex and subsequent DNA unwinding does not require ATP hydrolysis.

The oriC site in E. coli has three AT rich 13 base pair regions (DUEs) followed by four 9 bp regions with the sequence TTAT(C or A)CA(C or A)A. DnaA molecules bind to the 9 bp regions, which wrap around the proteins causing the DNA at the AT-rich region to unwind. There are currently 11 DnaA binding sites identified within oriC, to which DnaA binds with differential affinity. When DNA replication is about to commence, DnaA occupies all of the high and low affinity binding sites. The denatured AT-rich region allows for the recruitment of DnaB (helicase), which complexes with DnaC (helicase loader). DnaC helps the helicase to bind to and to properly accommodate the ssDNA at the 13 bp region; this is accomplished by ATP hydrolysis, after which DnaC is released. Single-strand binding proteins (SSBs) stabilize the single DNA strands in order to maintain the replication bubble. DnaB is a 5'→3' helicase, so it travels on the lagging strand. It associates with DnaG (a primase) to form the only primer for the leading strand and to add RNA primers on the lagging strand. The interaction between DnaG and DnaB is necessary to control the longitude of Okazaki fragments on the lagging strand. DNA polymerase III is then able to start DNA replication.

DnaA is made up of four domains: the first is the N-terminal that associates with regulatory proteins, the second is a helical linker region, the third domain is a AAA+ region that binds to ATP, and the fourth domain is the C-terminal DNA binding region. DnaA contains two conserved regions: the first is located in the central part of the protein and corresponds to the ATP-binding domain, the second is located in the C-terminal half and is involved in DNA-binding.

== DnaA mutants ==
The first strains to have the dnaA gene mutated were the temperature-sensitive K-12 strains CRT46 and CRT83, with the corresponding strain numbers beingdnaA46 and dnaA83. In contrary to dnaA mutants, the PC2 strain has a mutation in the dnaC gene, which codes for the loading factor for the DNA helicase dnaB.

== Synthesis ==
DnaA has the ability to bind its own promoter. When DnaA binds to its own promoter it blocks RNA polymerase from binding the promoter and inhibits initiation of transcription. In this way, DnaA is able to regulate its own expression. This process is called autoregulation.

== Regulation ==
Each cell division cycle triggers a new round of chromosome replication with the accumulation of DnaA, the initiator protein, on the OriC region of DNA. It is crucial to regulate DnaA-ATP monomer interactions with oriC during helicase loading and unwinding of origin DNA for precise timing. DnaA recognition sites in Escherichia coli are arranged in OriC to facilitate staged pre-replication complex assembling, with DnaA interacting with low affinity sites as it oligomerizes to fill the gaps between high affinity sites as it oligomerizes. There may be numerous gap-filling strategies to link OriC functions to bacterial lifestyles in nature, which may account for the wide variability of OriC DnaA recognition site patterns. The two forms of DnaA, the active ATP- and ADP-form are regulated. The ATP-form is converted to the ADP-form through either Regulatory inactivation of DnaA (RIDA), which in turn consists of the Hda protein and the β sliding clamp (DnaN) and datA-dependent DnaA-ATP hydrolysis. The ADP-form is converted to the ATP-form by DnaA-reactivating sequences 1 and 2 (DARS1 and DARS2).

Regulation of DnaA binding to DNA at OriC

Since DNA replication must occur irreversibly and only once per cycle, the binding behavior of DnaA complexes to OriC is a highly regulated, and therefore dependent on many other cellular mechanisms. While all OriC sites are bound at replication initiation, there are three high-affinity binding sites–R1, R2, and R4–that are typically occupied by DnaA for the majority of the cell cycle, thus making their binding somewhat less dependent of other events happening within the cell at a given point in time. By contrast, the lower affinity sites are typically only bound to DnaA complexes right before replication begins. There are currently eight identified sites with lower DnaA/OriC binding affinity: R5 (or R5M), I1, I2, I3 and R3, tau2, C1, C2 and C3. Between the R1 and R2 high affinity sites exist the R5M, tau2, I1, and I2 low affinity sites, and C3, C2, 13, and C1 exist between the R2 and R4 sites. The I sites, tau2, C2, and C3 sites preferentially bind with and are more efficient at binding to DnaA in its ATP-bound active form (DnaA-ATP) prior to DNA strand separation, whereas the R1-R5 sites and C1 site have not demonstrated a preference for binding with DnaA-ATP over DnaA-ADP. OriC binding with active DnaA-ATP complexes at the lower affinity I sites, as well as the tau2, C2, and C3, sites is required for the strand separation process to initiate in a time regulated manner, meaning DnaA-ATP cannot be substituted with inactive DnaA-ADP complexes to initiate replication properly and with sufficient regulation. Recent studies suggest that while OriC sites bound entirely to DnaA-ADP complexes are capable of preparing the cell for DNA replication, they struggle to maintain the healthy and consistent replication frequency regulation cells continuing OriC sites bound to DnaA-ATP complexes achieve, perhaps explaining why some sites bind preferentially to the active DnaA conformation over the inactive conformation. Two other proteins, an integration host factor (IHF) protein and a DnaA initiator associating (DiaA) protein, help facilitate the binding of DnaA-ATP complexes to the OriC sites and set the stage for replication initiation to occur.

IHF plays a key functional role positively regulating the binding of DnaA complexes to the lower affinity OriC sites as the cell prepares for replication, essentially evening the playing field between the high and low affinity OriC sites in terms of their ability to bind with DnaA complexes. Cooperative binding is thought to be a mechanism in which the high-affinity sites supply the lower-affinity sites within their vicinity with DnaA-ATP complexes in the moments leading up to replication initiation. While DnaA can saturate all OriC binding sites in systems lacking IHF, a much higher concentration of DnaA is needed in the cellular environment for this to be achieved. However, in these situations, cells also experience a loss of synchronization in their replication initiation timing, indicating how important IHF is for maintaining consistent regulation of this process in cells and preventing a lag in the initiation of replication. When IHF is present in a cellular system, IHF enhances DnaA binding to low affinity OriC sites without any need for increasing the baseline concentration of DnaA present, further highlighting its importance in maintaining replication initiation timing.

Conformationally, IHF assists in promoting the process of DnaA-ATP complexes binding to the low affinity OriC binding sites at the right time by binding to a different site on OriC ahead of replication initiation, causing DNA it to bend in such a way that facilitates efficient binding with DnaA-ATP complexes. Prior to IHF binding to OriC, a different protein, factor for inversion stimulation (FIS) protein, is bound to DNA for the majority of the cell cycle (with the exception of the events leading up to replication initiation), inhibiting the binding of IHF to DNA. Consequently, the binding of DnaA complexes to the lower affinity OriC sites is also inhibited, thus, preventing the chromosomal replication process from starting prematurely and thereby demonstrating how FIS positively regulates the maintenance of a consistent cell cycle progression via inhibition. As FIS binding to OriC weakens, IHF begins to bind to OriC, therefore increasing the low affinity sites' ability to bind to DnaA-ATP complexes, concurrent with IHF binding. The switch from FIS binding to IHF binding to DNA is hypothesized to be brought about by the generation of more DnaA-ATP complexes, promoted by the existence of the high affinity sites bound to DnaA while FIS is concurrently bound to DNA, which are then recruited to the high affinity region and build up, exerting a conformational stress on bound FIS (especially by accumulation at the R2 site, as it is closest to the FIS binding site), thereby deteriorating its binding ability with DNA. As a result, IHF can take advantage of the weakened state of FIS binding so that it can then bind to its own respective OriC site, causing DNA to bend and essentially align the accumulated DnaA-ATP complexes better with the low affinity binding sites, thus aiding in the facilitation of their binding with DnaA-ATP. In the absence of the switch-like behavior that occurs with the transition from FIS to IHF binding to DNA, cells are unable to maintain a control over the sequence of events that ensure replication initiation happens both irreversibly and only once per cell cycle.

DiaA positively regulates the replication initiation timeline by facilitating the binding of DnaA-ATP complexes on OriC sites. DiaA binds to DnaA in its tetrameric form (consisting of four DiaA protomers (individual proteins) bound to one another), specifically to the first domain of DnaA–in the same region where another protein, replicative DNA helicase (DnaB), is presumed to bind with DnaA. Due to its tetrameric structure, DiaA has the ability to bind to multiple DnaA-ATP complexes at a time, as each protamer within the homotetramer consists of an DnaA-ATP binding site. This beneficial characteristic of DiaA tetramers can aid in promoting the cooperative binding behavior of transferring DnaA-ATP molecules to different sites on the OriC region of DNA as the cell prepares to undergo chromosomal replication. DiaA also negatively regulates the chromosomal replication process by inhibiting the binding of the DnaB protein, whose presence and function is required for chromosomal replication, from binding to DnaA-ATP complexes assembled on OriC, therefore helping to preserve the inflexible regulation sequence of events needed for a controlled replication process and prevents asynchronous initiation within the overall cycle cycle. Thus, taken together, IHF and DiaA, along with the proteins they interact with in their respective binding mechanisms, are very both important for helping DnaA-ATP complexes bind to all the identified binding sites on OriC, including the low affinity sites, within a timely manner that ensures replication initiation occurs irreversibly and only a single time during the cell cycle.

Once replication initiation has occurred and DNA has undergone strand separation successfully, a different process commences to make sure DnaA-ATP cannot bind directly to DNA again with a protein that negatively regulates replication initiation–the locus of datA–SeqA. When DNA unwinds post-initiation, new replication forks are generated, a process that subsequently leads to the unbinding of DnaA complexes from the OriC sites. DNA's GATC sites within OriC and at the region where the dnaA promoter exists become hemimethylated, and therefore experience a reduced ability to function and express the same way as they would while methylated. SeqA is able to physically prevent replication from starting up again prematurely by binding to the hemimethylated GATA sites on OriC–many of which somewhat overlap with a couple of the low affinity binding DnaA binding sites, as well as IHF's binding site on OriC–essentially shielding IHF and DnaA from binding to OriC. However, the high affinity OriC DnaA complex binding sites are not blocked by SeqA binding to DNA, thus explaining how DnaA stays bound to the three high affinity sites throughout the majority of the cycle cycle duration. When GATC sites are bound to SeqA while hemimethylated, they are limited in their ability to synthesize new DnaA proteins as well, thus causing DnaA concentration within the cell to decline post initiation. Thus, with these sites blocked by SeqA, DnaA-ATP binding to some of the lower affinity sites is not possible for a combination of reasons. In studies performed with strains lacking the ability to produce SeqA, cells were unable to synchronously initiate replication once per cycle, mirroring the effects of what happens when cells lack IHF. Since the binding of the low affinity sites on OriC are basically the key event that kick start replication initiation and DNA's unraveling, SeqA's blocking of DnaA-ATP complex binding during the majority of the cell cycle is vital for keep cells healthy by maintaining a consistent cycle.

== DnaA protein structure ==
There are four disciplines within the DnaA protein. An initial comparison of Escherichia coli and Bacillus subtilis proteins led to the discovery of a sphere structure, which revealed a relatively conserved N-terminus and a largely conserved large C-terminus separated by a region that was mostly variable. As an example, the Enterobacterial proteins have nearly identical N- and C-terminal sequences, however they are characterized by numerous amino acid adjustments, elisions, and insertions in the variable regions. There is an AAA+ family ATPase motif and an independent DNA binding sphere in the C-terminal region. It was determined by NMR that Escherichia coli sphere IV had a crystal-clear structure when complexed with a DnaA- box. As a result, it was confirmed that the DNA list is intermediated by a combination of a helix-turn-helix motif and an introductory circle. When bound to ATP, but not to ADP, DnaA forms a super-helical structure with four monomers per turn. The structure of sphere I has been determined from three additional bacterial species and Escherichia coli by NMR.

== Autoregulation of DnaA protein synthesis ==
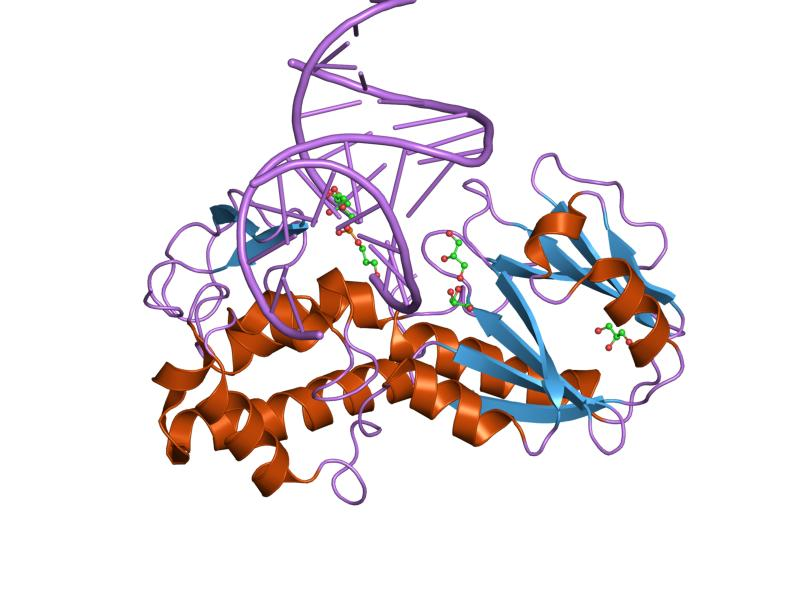
DnaA protein structure

The research on dnaA(Ts) mutants provided the first proof that the dnaA gene is autoregulated. DnaA protein is still produced at non-permissive temperatures where it is inactive, but in some mutants it can be made active again by returning to a temperature that is conducive to development. This reversible initiation capacity—which was larger than anticipated given the mass gain of the culture—could be seen in the absence of protein synthesis at the permissive temperature and suggested that the DnaA protein synthesis was derepressed at the high growth temperature. These results prompted a thorough investigation of the dnaA46 mutant under permissive, intermediate, and non-permissive development conditions. The study's findings revealed that as growth temperature increased, the DnaA46 protein's activity decreased, leading to progressively decreasing DNA and origin concentrations at intermediate temperatures. An increase in initiation capacity was seen concurrently with a decrease in DnaA protein activity. Hansen and Rasmussen (1977) argued that the DnaA protein had a positive effect in replication initiation aing transcripts entering the dnaA gene were found as a result of sequencing the dnaA promoter region and the dnaA gene. The DnaA promoter region has nine GATC sites within 225 base pairs, and a sequence that is similar to nd a negative role in its own synthesis based on these observations. Two promoters providrepetitions (DnaA-boxes) in the oriC region was found between the two promoters. According to several studies, the DnaA protein negatively regulates both promoters. In these research, it was discovered that the dnaA transcription was upregulated by 4- to 5-fold at non-permissive temperatures in dnaATs mutants and repressed by the same amount when DnaA protein was overproduced. The autoregulation of the dnaA gene requires the DnaA-box. The sequence of the dnaA2p promoter region has some intriguing characteristics that can be seen more clearly. This promoter contains two GATC sites, one in the 10 sequence and the other in the 35 sequence, and both in vivo and in vitro, methylation increases transcription from this promoter by a factor of two. In addition, DnaA protein binds to regions upstream of the dnaA2p promoter with a high affinity.

== See also ==
- Origin recognition complex
