= Replication terminator protein =

Identifiers
- Symbol: RTP
- Pfam: PF02334
- InterPro: IPR003432
- SCOP2: 1bm9 / SCOPe / SUPFAM
Available protein structures:
- Pfam: structures / ECOD
- PDB: RCSB PDB; PDBe; PDBj
- PDBsum: structure summary

The replication terminator protein (RTP) is a DNA-binding protein that helps terminate DNA replication in Bacillus. It has a winged-helix structure and forms a homodimer via hydrogen bonds. The dimer is symmetric when it is not bound to DNA, but becomes asymmetrical when it is bound. Its termination activity is polar: it stops the replication fork from continuing in one direction, but a fork going the other direction is allowed to proceed.

== Binding site ==
Each RTP dimer binds to a binding site 20 bp long. A ter site on the actual bacterial chromosome consists of two dimer-binding sites "A" and "B", with 3 bp of overlap. The "A" site matches the preference of RTP better and hence has higher affinity. Binding of the "A" site with an RTP dimer changes the shape of the "B" site such that it is easier to bind to another RTP dimer.

== Mechanism ==
Before 2006, it was assumed that RTP simply terminates DNA replication by clamping onto the DNA and physically blocking the replication fork. In 2006, a study found that the contact between RTP and the DNA replication machinery likely also plays a role.
