= DnaC =

DNA replication protein DnaC

Identifiers
- Organism: Escherichia coli (str. K-12 substr. MG1655)
- Symbol: dnaC
- Entrez: 948864
- Orthologs: NCBI: entry; OMA: entry
- RefSeq (Prot): NP_418781.1
- UniProt: P0AEF0

Other data
- EC number: 2.7.7.7
- Chromosome: Genomic: 4.6 - 4.6 Mb
Search for
- Structures: Swiss-model
- Domains: InterPro

dnaC is a prokaryotic loading factor found in Escherichia coli that complexes with the C-terminus of helicase dnaB during the initial stages of prokaryotic DNA replication, loading dnaB onto DNA and inhibiting it from unwinding double stranded DNA (dsDNA) at a replication fork. Both dnaB and dnaC associate near the dnaA bound origin for each of the single stranded DNA molecules (ssDNA). Since DNA is antiparallel, one dnaB-dnaC complex is oriented in the opposite direction to the other dnaB-dnaC complex. After the assembly of dnaG, a primase, onto the N-terminus of dnaB, dnaC is released and dnaB will be allowed to begin unwinding dsDNA to make room for DNA polymerase to begin synthesizing the daughter strands.

This interaction of dnaC with dnaB requires the hydrolysis of ATP.

== dnaC Function ==
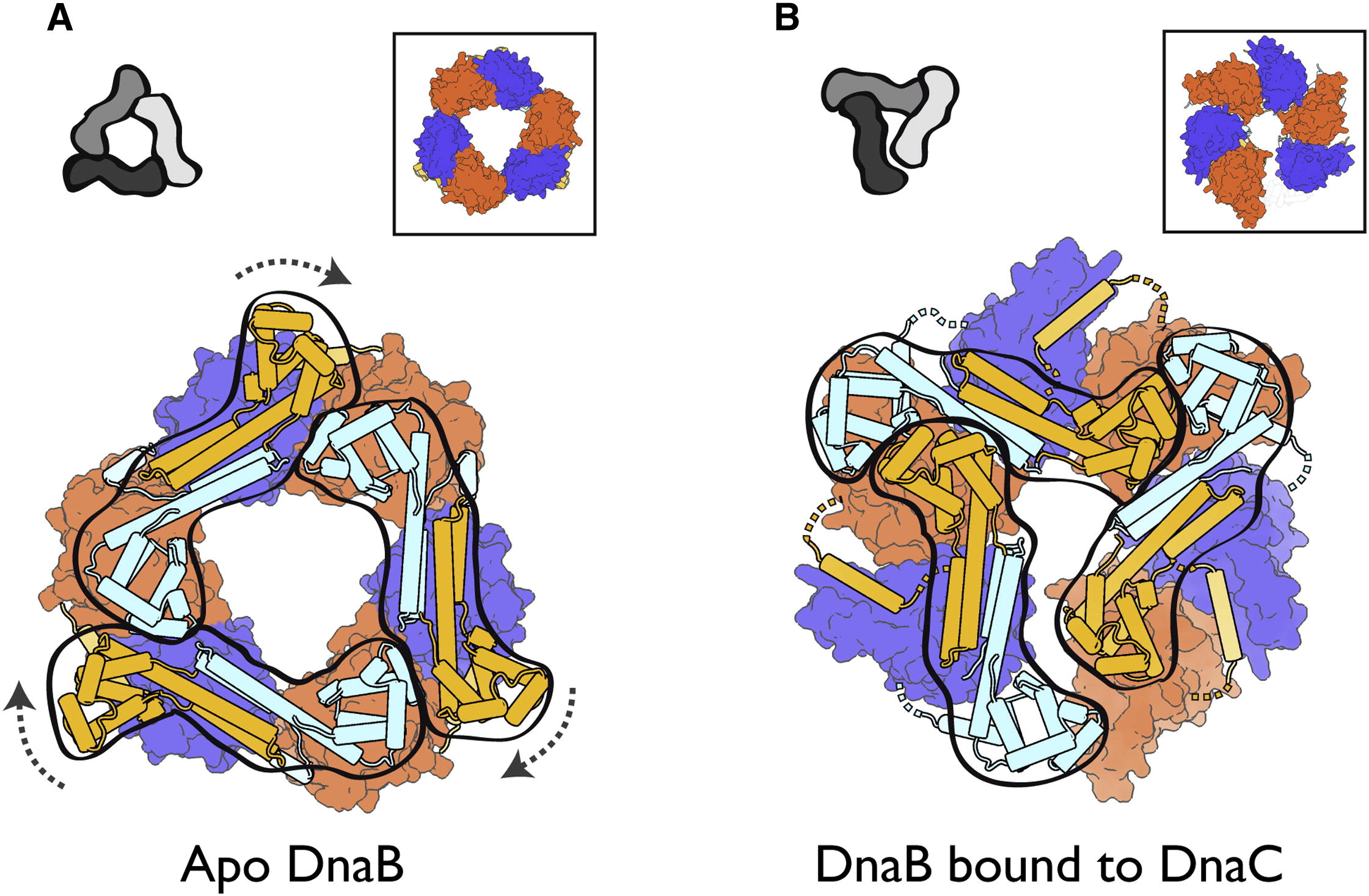
Image displaying apoenzyme of dnaB and the dnaB-dnaC complex. Changes in structure before and after binding can be seen, such as opening of ring structure.

=== Association of dnaB-dnaC complex ===
Since dnaC functions as a helicase loader, dnaB helicase is needed. Specifically, for dnaC function a complex with dnaB is formed. dnaB is a hexameric protein with helicase properties that allow it to unwind DNA at the origin site, oriC. When dnaC associates with dnaB and ATP, dnaB and dnaC form dimers with six dnaC polypeptides. This is due to a conformational change of dnaC. These dimers a specific structure, containing a small lobe and a large lobe. The small lobe attaches to one monomer of the dnaB, while the large lobe associates with subunits of neighboring dnaB. dnaB transforms from a closed ring structure to an open ring structure with the addition of dnaC and ATP. The binding of the two proteins is because of interactions regarding their amino acids. Amino acids on the N terminus of dnaC associate with the carboxyl terminal domain of dnaB. When this happens, there is also a conformational change of the RecA fold on dnaB and the AAA+ domain of dnaC. The RecA fold is responsible for DNA binding and the AAA+ domain of dnaC is needed for ATP binding and hydrolysis. ATP hydrolysis is necessary for the function of dnaC later in replication. Additionally, dnaC impacts hairpins of the N-terminal domain of dnaB and the N-terminal domain of dnaB can be modified by dnaC to impact interactions with dnaG, a primase. The new dnaB-dnaC complex formed can now aid in loading dnaB to the origin of replication.

=== Binding of dnaB-dnaC complex to DNA ===
The dnaB-dnaC complex is able to open and close like a clamp due to its ring-like structure. To start binding, a region in the DNA is unwound slightly by the protein dnaA attached to dnaA boxes. The slight unwinding allows for the dnaB-dnaC complex to associate with the DNA replication fork. These interactions with the replication fork are impacted by the AAA+ domain on the C-terminal domain of dnaC. For single strand binding, ATP hydrolysis of dnaC is needed for the complex to bind to the template ssDNA with a high affinity. ATP is hydrolyzed to ADP and the complex is able to bind and close its ring-like structure around the DNA strand. When the dnaB-dnaC complex initially binds to the DNA, it is inactive. To activate dnaB, dnaC has to be released. When this occurs, dnaB is translocated and can begin unwinding the DNA for replication.

=== Dissociation of dnaC and activation of dnaB ===
For dnaB to complete helicase activity, dnaC is required to dissociate from the dnaB-dnaC complex. The release of dnaC from dnaB relies on multiple factors. First, a hydrolysis reaction that specifically requires ATP needs to occur. This reaction is the same one used to bind the complex to the ssDNA at the replication fork. In addition, interactions with dnaG on the N-terminal domain of dnaB are necessary to disrupt the dnaB-dnaC complex. This interaction and hydrolysis reaction releases dnaC from the C-terminal domain of dnaB. Once dnaC dissociates from the complex, dnaB is able to perform helicase activities for DNA replication. These allow for the ssDNA to be available to primase and other proteins necessary to create a complementary strand of the template DNA.

== Current Research ==
Current research is ongoing regarding dnaC and its role in prokaryotic DNA replication. Research groups are using a variety of physical and molecular methods to further knowledge. Topics include the role of single stranded binding proteins, potentially exploiting the dnaC-dnaB complex for peptide antibiotics, interactions with other proteins like dnaE, and others. Additionally, other prokaryotic helicase loaders, like DciA in bacteria, are being investigated due to their similar properties to dnaC.
