= DnaB helicase =

Replicative DNA helicase

Identifiers
- Symbol: DnaB
- NCBI gene: 948555
- UniProt: P0ACB0

Other data
- EC number: 3.6.1.-
Search for
- Structures: Swiss-model
- Domains: InterPro

DnaB-like helicase N terminal domain
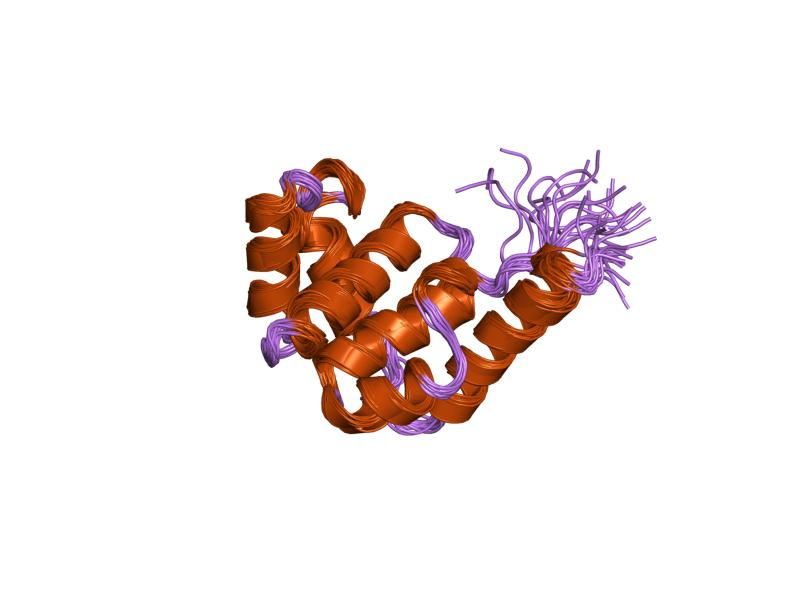
- nmr structure of the n-terminal domain of E. coli Dnab helicase

Identifiers
- Symbol: DnaB
- Pfam: PF00772
- InterPro: IPR007693
- SCOP2: 1jwe / SCOPe / SUPFAM
Available protein structures:
- PDB: IPR007693 PF00772 (ECOD; PDBsum)
- AlphaFold: IPR007693; PF00772

DnaB-like helicase C terminal domain

Identifiers
- Symbol: DnaB_C
- Pfam: PF03796
- Pfam clan: CL0023
- InterPro: IPR007694
- CDD: cd00984
Available protein structures:
- PDB: IPR007694 PF03796 (ECOD; PDBsum)
- AlphaFold: IPR007694; PF03796

DnaB helicase is an enzyme in bacteria which opens the replication fork during DNA replication. Although the mechanism by which DnaB both couples ATP hydrolysis to translocation along DNA and denatures the duplex is unknown, a change in the quaternary structure of the protein involving dimerisation of the N-terminal domain has been observed and may occur during the enzymatic cycle. Initially when DnaB binds to dnaA, it is associated with dnaC, a negative regulator. After DnaC dissociates, DnaB binds dnaG.

The N-terminal has a multi-helical structure that forms an orthogonal bundle. The C-terminal domain contains an ATP-binding site and is therefore probably the site of ATP hydrolysis.

In eukaryotes, helicase function is provided by the MCM (Minichromosome maintenance) complex.

The DnaB helicase is the product of the dnaB gene. DnaB is expressed as a monomer and oligomerises into hexamer through N-terminal interactions. Replicative helicases have a central ring and that feature is conserved across bacterial to eukaryotes. The energy for DnaB activity is provided by NTP hydrolysis. Mechanical energy moves the DnaB into the replication fork, physically splitting it in half.

== E. coli dnaB ==
In E. coli, dnaB is a hexameric protein of six 471-residue subunits, which form a ring-shaped structure with threefold symmetry. During DNA replication, the lagging strand of DNA binds in the central channel of dnaB, and the second DNA strand is excluded. The binding of NTPs causes a conformational change and subsequent hydrolysis allows the dnaB to translocate along the DNA, thus mechanically forcing the separation of the DNA strands.

== Mechanism of initiation of replication ==
At least 10 different enzymes or proteins participate in the initiation phase of replication. They open the DNA helix at the origin and establish a prepriming complex for subsequent reactions. The crucial component in the initiation process is the DnaA protein, a member of the AAA+ ATPase protein family (ATPases associated with diverse cellular activities). Many AAA+ ATPases, including DnaA, form oligomers and hydrolyze ATP relatively slowly. This ATP hydrolysis acts as a switch mediating interconversion of the protein between two states. In the case of DnaA, the ATP-bound form is active and the ADP-bound form is inactive.

Eight DnaA protein molecules, all in the ATP-bound state, assemble to form a helical complex encompassing the R and I sites in oriC. DnaA has a higher affinity for the R sites than I sites, and binds R sites equally well in its ATP or ADP-bound form. The I sites, which bind only the ATP-bound DnaA, allow discrimination between the active and inactive forms of DnaA. The tight right-handed wrapping of the DNA around this complex introduces an effective positive supercoil. The associated strain in the nearby DNA leads to denaturation in the A:T-rich 'DUE' (DNA Unwinding Element) region. The complex formed at the replication origin also includes several DNA-binding proteins- Hu, IHF and FIS that facilitate DNA bending.

The DnaC protein, another AAA+ ATPase, then loads the DnaB protein onto the separated DNA strands in the denatured region. A hexamer of DnaC, each subunit bound to ATP, forms a tight complex with the hexameric, ring-shaped DnaB helicase. This DnaC-DnaB interaction opens the DnaB ring, the process being aided by a further interaction between DnaB and DnaA. Two of the ring-shaped DnaB hexamers are loaded in the DUE, one onto each DNA strand. The ATP bound to DnaC is hydrolyzed, releasing the DnaC and leaving the DnaB bound to the DNA.

Loading of the DnaB helicase is the key step in replication initiation. As a replicative helicase, DnaB migrates along the single-stranded DNA in the 5'→3' direction, unwinding the DNA as it travels. The DnaB helicases loaded onto the two DNA strands thus travel in opposite directions, creating two potential replication forks. All other proteins at the replication fork are linked directly or indirectly to DnaB.
