= GINS =

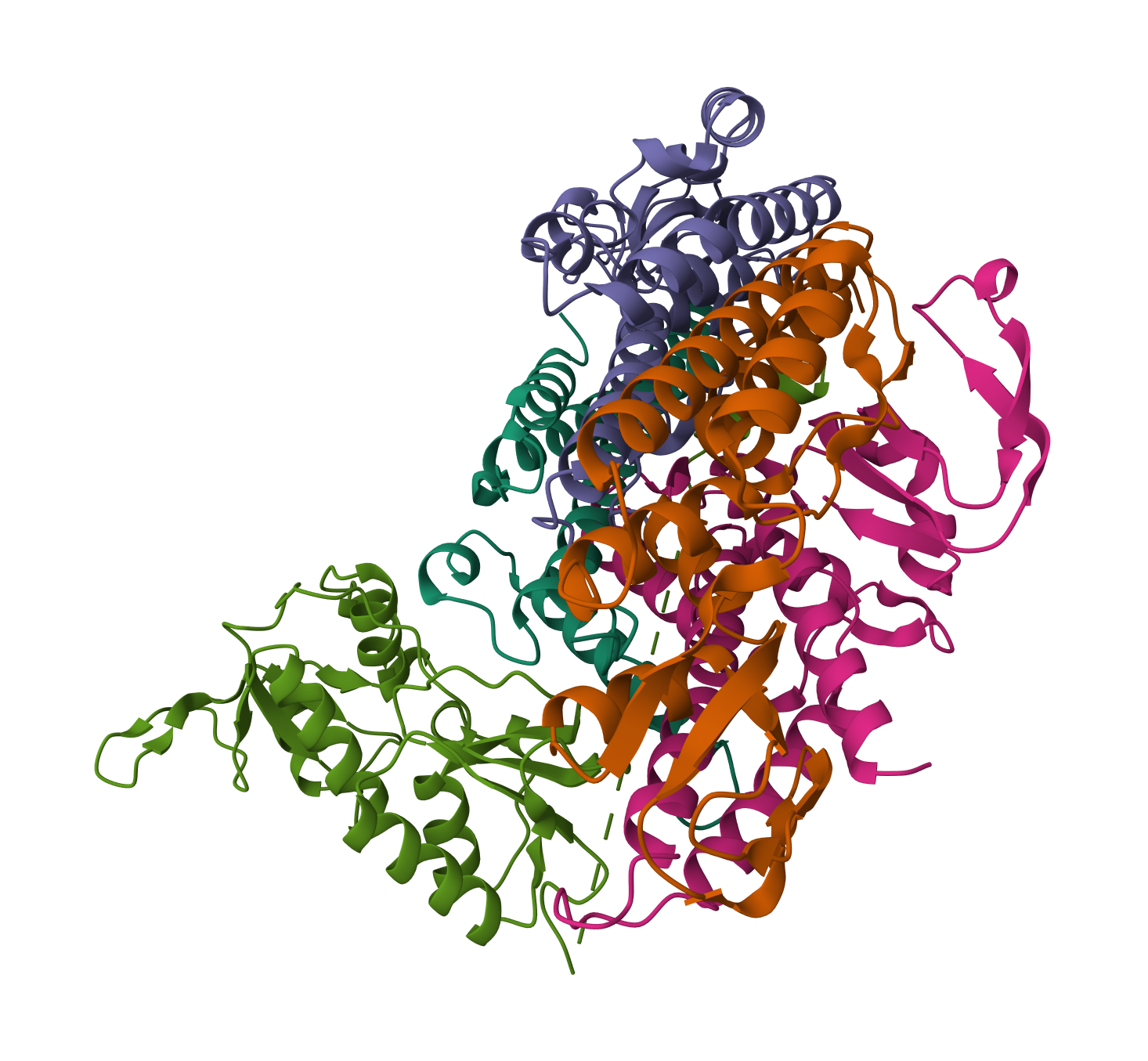
dark green: DNA replication complex GINS protein PSF1, Gene names: GINS1, KIAA0186, PSF1 brown: DNA replication complex GINS protein PSF2, Gene names: CGI-122, DC5, GINS2, HSPC037, PSF2 violet: DNA replication complex GINS protein PSF3, Gene names: GINS3, PSF3 pink: DNA replication complex GINS protein SLD5, Gene names: GINS4, SLD5 light green: DNA topoisomerase 2-binding protein 1, Gene names: KIAA0259, TOPBP1

GINS is a protein complex essential to the DNA replication process in the cells of eukaryotes. The complex participates in the initiation and elongation stages of replication.

The name GINS is an acronym created from the first letters of the Japanese numbers 5-1-2-3 (go-ichi-ni-san) in a reference to the 4 protein subunits of the complex: GINS1, GINS2, GINS3, and GINS4.

A similar complex has been identified in Archaea.

== See also ==
- Eukaryotic DNA replication#GINS Explains role of GINS during DNA replication in eukaryotic cells.
