= DDK =

DDK abbreviation may refer to:

- In software development, a Driver Development Kit, including Microsoft Windows Driver Development Kit
- In hull codes of United States Navy, an abolished surface combatant warship category 'Hunter-Killer Destroyer'
- In medical signs, Dysdiadochokinesia, a type of cerebellar ataxia
- In molecular biology, Cdc7/Dbf4 kinase, or Dbf4-dependent kinase, — protein kinase required for initiation of eukaryotic DNA replication.
- In snooker, a Dreaded Double Kiss, coined by Dennis Taylor
- DDK, the National Rail station code for Dagenham Dock railway station, London, England
