= Resting stage =

Resting stage may refer to:

- The diapause stage of a butterfly egg
- Telogen phase, a phase of hair follicle growth
- A phase of cell cycle regulation in eukaryotic DNA replication
- The pupal phase of insect metamorphosis

== See also ==
- Resting spore
- G_{0} phase or resting phase
