= Mir-885 microRNA precursor family =

mir-885

Identifiers
- Symbol: mir-885
- Rfam: RF01015
- miRBase family: MIPF0000532

Other data
- RNA type: microRNA
- Domain(s): Eukaryota;
- PDB structures: PDBe

In molecular biology mir-885 microRNA is a short RNA molecule. MicroRNAs function to regulate the expression levels of other genes by several mechanisms.

== miR-885-5p in neuroblastoma ==
The miR-885-5p form of this microRNA acts as a tumour suppressor in neuroblastoma, through interference with cell cycle progression and cell survival. It is found at 3p25.3, a chromosome region frequently deleted in primary neuroblastoma, and expression results in p53 protein accumulation and pathway activation. Altered expression of multiple genes is observed with miR-885-5p, including the CDK2 and MCM5 genes encoding cyclin-dependent kinase 2 and mini-chromosome maintenance protein MCM5, and also with several p53 target genes.

== Biological Implication ==
=== Clinical Biomarker ===
Circulating miRNAs (microRNAs) are emerging as promising biomarkers for several pathological conditions. similarly, miR-885-5p found as a potential marker for liver disease condition. It is significantly elevated in the patients sera with liver pathologies, and researcher suggested that serum miRNAs could serve as novel complementary biomarkers for the detection and assessment of liver pathologies. These unique miRNAs may be clinically applicable to predict prognosis and distant metastasis in colorectal cancer (CRC). The direct comparison of expression patterns of metastasis-specific microRNAs (miRNAs) in primary CRCs (pCRCs) and matched liver metastases (LMs) provides a feasibility of their clinical application as metastasis-specific biomarkers. In a clinical study it has been found that miR-885-5p is increased in plasma from pre-eclampsia compared with healthy pregnant women, and it is released into circulation mainly inside exosomes.

=== Cancer ===
In search of an effective therapeutic strategy for improving colon cancer treatment, a novel role of miR-885-3p has been observed in tumor angiogenesis by targeting BMPR1A, which regulates a proangiogenic factor, and provide new evidence that targeting miRNAs might be an effective therapeutic strategy.

== See also ==
- MicroRNA
