= GINS1 =

Protein-coding gene in the species Homo sapiens

Available structures
PDB	Ortholog search: PDBe RCSB
PDB	List of PDB id codes 2E9X, 2EHO, 2Q9Q

Identifiers
- Aliases: GINS1, PSF1, GINS complex subunit 1, IMD55
- External IDs: OMIM: 610608; MGI: 1916520; HomoloGene: 44516; GeneCards: GINS1; OMA:GINS1 - orthologs

Gene location (Human)
Chr.	Chromosome 20 (human)
Band	20p11.21	Start	25,391,008 bp
Band	20p11.21	End	25,452,700 bp

Gene location (Mouse)
Chr.	Chromosome 2 (mouse)
Band	2|2 G3	Start	150,747,320 bp
Band	2|2 G3	End	150,773,200 bp
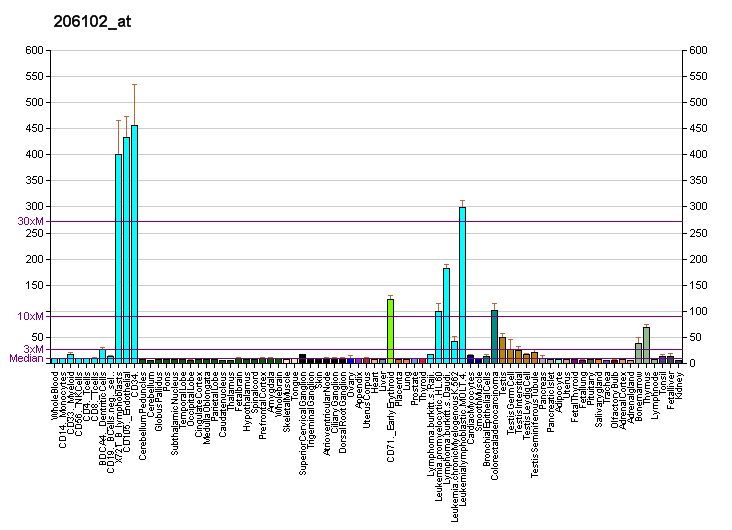
RNA expression pattern
Bgee	Human / Mouse (ortholog); Top expressed in: oocyte; secondary oocyte; sperm; embryo; ventricular zone; right testis; left testis; ganglionic eminence; endothelial cell; trabecular bone / Top expressed in: medial ganglionic eminence; primitive streak; fetal liver hematopoietic progenitor cell; otic vesicle; ventricular zone; spermatocyte; tail of embryo; otic placode; abdominal wall; primary oocyte; More reference expression data
BioGPS	More reference expression data
Gene ontology
Molecular function	3'-5' DNA helicase activity
Cellular component	cytoplasm; nucleus; nucleoplasm; GINS complex
Biological process	DNA replication; DNA strand elongation involved in mitotic DNA replication; DNA strand elongation involved in DNA replication; inner cell mass cell proliferation; DNA duplex unwinding
Sources:Amigo / QuickGO
Orthologs
Species	Human	Mouse
Entrez	9837	69270
Ensembl	ENSG00000101003	ENSMUSG00000027454
UniProt	Q14691	Q9CZ15
RefSeq (mRNA)	NM_021067	NM_001163476; NM_027014
RefSeq (protein)	NP_066545	NP_001156948; NP_081290
Location (UCSC)	Chr 20: 25.39 – 25.45 Mb	Chr 2: 150.75 – 150.77 Mb
PubMed search
- Wikidata
View/Edit Human	View/Edit Mouse

DNA replication complex GINS protein PSF1 is a protein that in humans is encoded by the GINS1 gene.

== See also ==
- GINS (protein complex)
- Eukaryotic DNA replication#GINS Explains role of GINS during DNA replication in eukaryotic cells.
