= TRIB1 =

Protein-coding gene in the species Homo sapiens

Identifiers
- Aliases: TRIB1, C8FW, GIG-2, GIG2, SKIP1, TRB-1, TRB1, tribbles pseudokinase 1
- External IDs: OMIM: 609461; MGI: 2443397; GeneCards: TRIB1
Available structures
PDB	Ortholog search: PDBe RCSB
PDB	List of PDB id codes 5CEM, 5CEK, 5IGO, 5IGQ

Gene location (Human)
Chr.	Chromosome 8 (human)
Band	8q24.13	Start	125,430,358 bp
Band	8q24.13	End	125,438,403 bp

Gene location (Mouse)
Chr.	Chromosome 15 (mouse)
Band	15|15 D1	Start	59,520,199 bp
Band	15|15 D1	End	59,528,948 bp
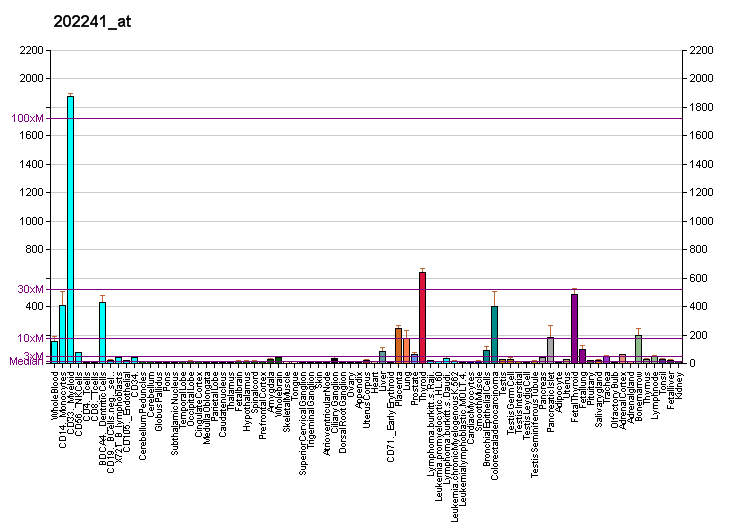
RNA expression pattern
Bgee	Human / Mouse (ortholog); Top expressed in: mucosa of urinary bladder; mucosa of sigmoid colon; visceral pleura; gallbladder; mucosa of paranasal sinus; tail of epididymis; parotid gland; Skeletal muscle tissue of rectus abdominis; kidney tubule; thyroid gland / Top expressed in: granulocyte; retinal pigment epithelium; parotid gland; lacrimal gland; tail of embryo; genital tubercle; islet of Langerhans; left colon; lens; lip; More reference expression data
BioGPS	More reference expression data
Gene ontology
Molecular function	protein kinase activity; ubiquitin-protein transferase regulator activity; protein kinase inhibitor activity; transcription factor binding; protein binding; mitogen-activated protein kinase kinase binding; ATP binding; ubiquitin protein ligase binding
Cellular component	cytoplasm; nucleus
Biological process	negative regulation of smooth muscle cell proliferation; negative regulation of protein kinase activity; positive regulation of macrophage differentiation; negative regulation of smooth muscle cell migration; negative regulation of DNA-binding transcription factor activity; negative regulation of neutrophil differentiation; negative regulation of lipopolysaccharide-mediated signaling pathway; protein phosphorylation; JNK cascade; response to lipopolysaccharide; positive regulation of eosinophil differentiation; regulation of MAP kinase activity; positive regulation of proteasomal ubiquitin-dependent protein catabolic process
Sources:Amigo / QuickGO
Orthologs
Databases	NCBI: entry; OMA: entry
Species	Human	Mouse
Entrez	10221	211770
Ensembl	ENSG00000173334	ENSMUSG00000032501
UniProt	Q96RU8	Q8K4K4
RefSeq (mRNA)	NM_001282985; NM_025195	NM_144549
RefSeq (protein)	NP_001269914; NP_079471	NP_653132
Location (UCSC)	Chr 8: 125.43 – 125.44 Mb	Chr 15: 59.52 – 59.53 Mb
PubMed search
- Wikidata
View/Edit Human	View/Edit Mouse

Tribbles homolog 1 is a protein kinase that in humans is encoded by the TRIB1 gene. Orthologs of this protein pseudokinase (pseudoenzyme) can be found almost ubiquitously throughout the animal kingdom. It exerts its biological functions through binding to signalling proteins of the MAPKK level of the MAPK pathway, therefore eliciting a regulatory role in the function of this pathway which mediates proliferation, apoptosis and differentiation in cells. Tribbles-1 is encoded by the trib1 gene, which in humans can be found on chromosome 8 at position 24.13 on the longest arm (q). Recent crystal structures show that Tribbles 1 has an unusual 3D structure, containing a 'broken' C-helix region, a binding site for ubiquitinated substrates such as C/EBPalpha and a key regulatory C-tail region. Like TRIB2 and TRIB3, TRIB1 has recently been considered as a potential allosteric drug target.

== Function ==
Tribbles-1 is one of three members of the Tribbles subfamily, which is a part of the CAMK Ser/Thr protein kinase family, of the protein kinase superfamily. The Tribbles subfamily is one of the pseudokinases, meaning that while expressing putative kinase regions in its structure, it is non-catalytic. The Tribbles subfamily lacks a functional ATP binding pocket, and therefore cannot phosphorylate its substrates; instead, Tribbles proteins function as scaffold proteins, which bind their substrates to localize them to or from their function

Expression of Tribbles-1 is highly variable, constantly changing with respect to time and cell-type, which suggests a large amount of regulation that exists in the cell. The protein's primary structure contains a PEST region, indicative of proteins that are highly susceptible to degradation in the cell; Tribbles-1 plays a role in regulating its own expression by binding to its substrate, which not only produces its function on the MAPK pathway, but also works to protect it from degradation whilst binding. This, in part, creates a positive feedback loop in the function of Tribbles-1, as the function of Tribbles-1 directly aids in the increase of the amount of it. As positive feedback loops are often seen throughout biology in circumstances that require the alleviation of an external stimulus, the positive feedback loop exhibited by Tribbles-1 suggests that it plays a functional role in cell response.
