= TRIB2 =

Protein-coding gene in the species Homo sapiens

Identifiers
- Aliases: TRIB2, C5FW, GS3955, TRB2, tribbles pseudokinase 2
- External IDs: OMIM: 609462; MGI: 2145021; GeneCards: TRIB2

Gene location (Human)
Chr.	Chromosome 2 (human)
Band	2p24.3	Start	12,716,910 bp
Band	2p24.3	End	12,742,734 bp

Gene location (Mouse)
Chr.	Chromosome 12 (mouse)
Band	12|12 A1.1	Start	15,841,728 bp
Band	12|12 A1.1	End	15,866,923 bp
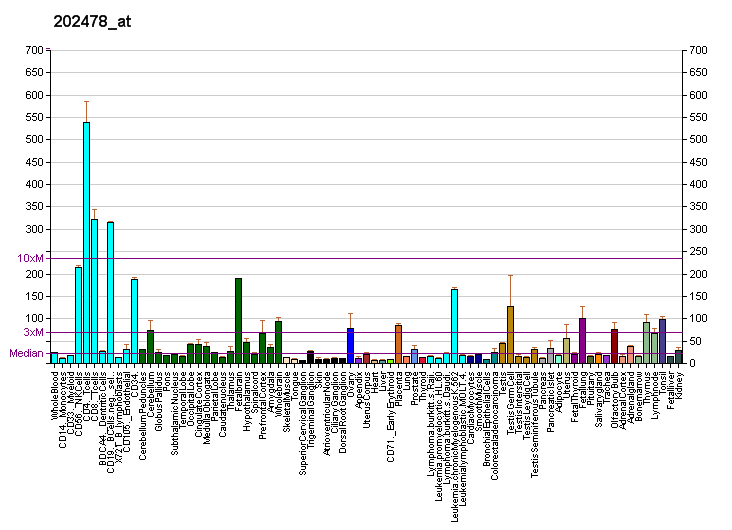

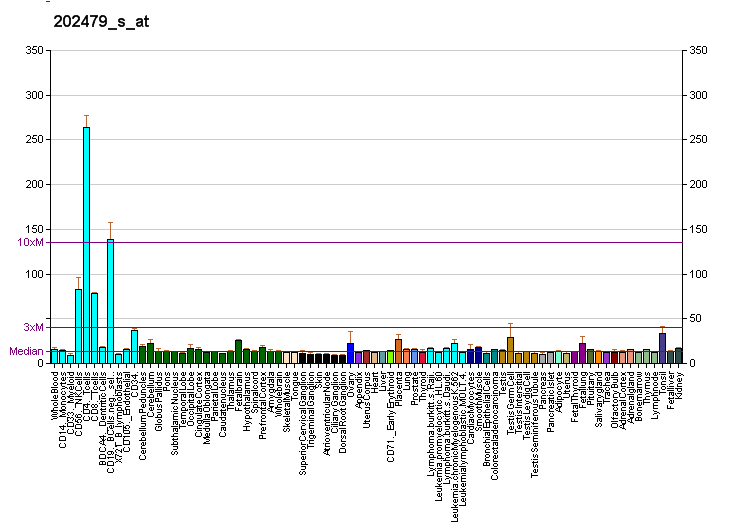
RNA expression pattern
Bgee	Human / Mouse (ortholog); Top expressed in: left ovary; ganglionic eminence; right ovary; tibial nerve; trigeminal ganglion; spleen; paraflocculus of cerebellum; renal medulla; left adrenal gland; ventricular zone / Top expressed in: Gonadal ridge; cumulus cell; vas deferens; efferent ductule; medial ganglionic eminence; interventricular septum; atrioventricular valve; saccule; retina; endocardial cushion; More reference expression data
BioGPS	More reference expression data
Gene ontology
Molecular function	nucleotide binding; protein kinase activity; protein kinase inhibitor activity; transcription factor binding; mitogen-activated protein kinase kinase binding; ubiquitin protein ligase binding; ubiquitin-protein transferase regulator activity
Cellular component	cytoplasm; cytoskeleton; nucleus
Biological process	regulation of MAP kinase activity; protein phosphorylation; negative regulation of fat cell differentiation; positive regulation of proteasomal ubiquitin-dependent protein catabolic process; negative regulation of protein kinase activity
Sources:Amigo / QuickGO
Orthologs
Databases	NCBI: entry; OMA: entry
Species	Human	Mouse
Entrez	28951	217410
Ensembl	ENSG00000071575	ENSMUSG00000020601
UniProt	Q92519	Q8K4K3
RefSeq (mRNA)	NM_021643	NM_144551
RefSeq (protein)	NP_067675	NP_653134
Location (UCSC)	Chr 2: 12.72 – 12.74 Mb	Chr 12: 15.84 – 15.87 Mb
PubMed search
- Wikidata
View/Edit Human	View/Edit Mouse

Tribbles homolog 2 is an atypical protein kinase that is encoded in human by the TRIB2 gene. TRIB2 is a pseudokinase member of the (pseudoenzyme) class of signaling/scaffold proteins, possessing very low vestigial catalytic output in vitro and critical scaffolding signaling functions in cells. It is known to signal to canonical MAPK and AKT pathways and to regulate the ubiquitination of substrates with important functions in cell proliferation that control the cell cycle. It has also been associated with various diseases, especially in human and murine blood and solid tumor models. Like TRIB1 and TRIB3, TRIB2 has recently been considered as a potential allosteric drug target, and its three dimensional structure has been solved with the aid of stabilizing nanobodies corroborating the potential for new approaches for drug targeting outside the highly degraded ATP site and is a putative regulator of cancer-associated signalling and survival through AKT pSer473 modulation. Recent work has established a convincing link between targetable overexpression of TRIB2 and prostate cancer drug responses
