= XL-413 =

Chemical compound

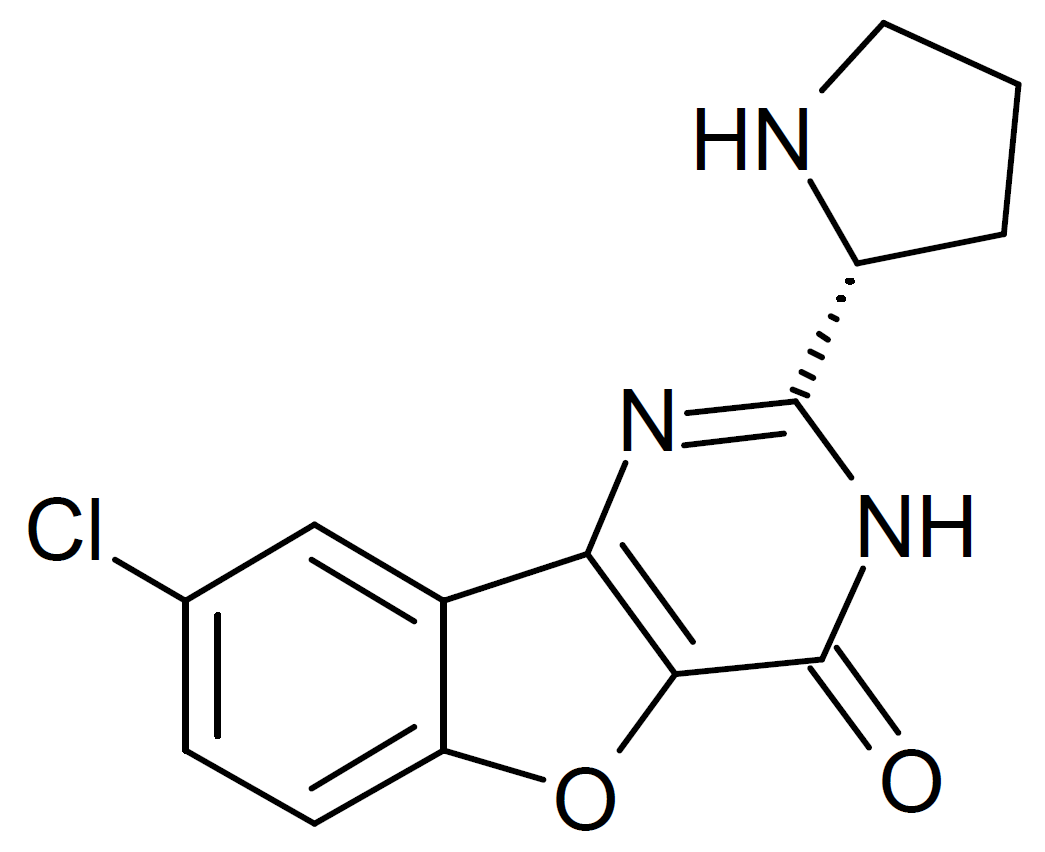

Identifiers
- IUPAC name: 8-chloro-2-[(2R)-pyrrolidin-2-yl]-3H-[1]benzofuro[3,2-d]pyrimidin-4-one
- CAS Number: 1169558-38-6
- PubChem CID: 137146968
- DrugBank: DB12357
- ChemSpider: 28508270
- UNII: 8QK62S7492
- ChEBI: CHEBI:189662
- CompTox Dashboard (EPA): DTXSID601022522

Chemical and physical data
- Formula: C_{14}H_{12}ClN_{3}O_{2}
- Molar mass: 289.72 g·mol^{−1}
- 3D model (JSmol): Interactive image
- SMILES: C1C[C@@H](NC1)C2=NC3=C(C(=O)N2)OC4=C3C=C(C=C4)Cl
- InChI: InChI=1S/C14H12ClN3O2/c15-7-3-4-10-8(6-7)11-12(20-10)14(19)18-13(17-11)9-2-1-5-16-9/h3-4,6,9,16H,1-2,5H2,(H,17,18,19)/t9-/m1/s1; Key:JJWLXRKVUJDJKG-SECBINFHSA-N

XL-413 is a drug which acts as a selective inhibitor of the enzyme cell division cycle 7-related protein kinase (CDC7). It is being researched for the treatment of some forms of cancer, and also has applications in genetic engineering.
