= TRIB3 =

Protein-coding gene in the species Homo sapiens

Identifiers
- Aliases: TRIB3, C20orf97, NIPK, SINK, SKIP3, TRB3, tribbles pseudokinase 3
- External IDs: OMIM: 607898; MGI: 1345675; GeneCards: TRIB3

Gene location (Human)
Chr.	Chromosome 20 (human)
Band	20p13	Start	362,835 bp
Band	20p13	End	397,559 bp

Gene location (Mouse)
Chr.	Chromosome 2 (mouse)
Band	2 G3|2 74.83 cM	Start	152,179,342 bp
Band	2 G3|2 74.83 cM	End	152,185,952 bp
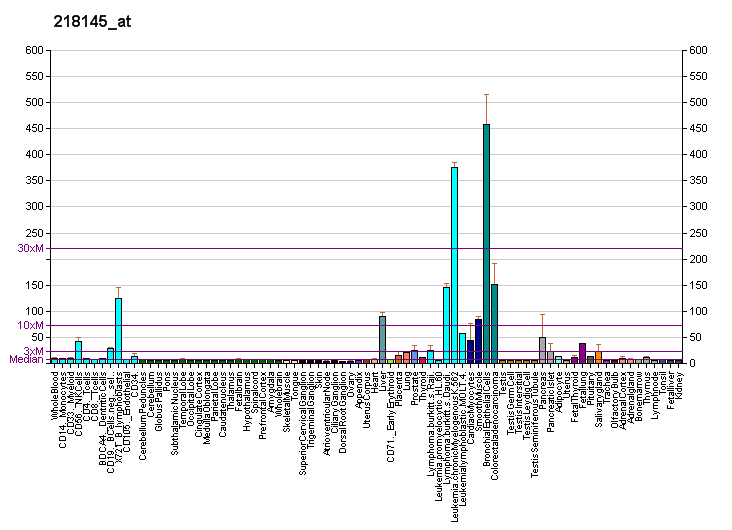
RNA expression pattern
Bgee	Human / Mouse (ortholog); Top expressed in: right lobe of liver; pancreatic ductal cell; gonad; islet of Langerhans; stromal cell of endometrium; upper lobe of left lung; optic nerve; body of pancreas; parotid gland; anterior pituitary / Top expressed in: lumbar spinal ganglion; endothelial cell of lymphatic vessel; calvaria; yolk sac; submandibular gland; seminal vesicula; ascending aorta; semi-lunar valve; aortic valve; olfactory epithelium; More reference expression data
BioGPS	More reference expression data
Gene ontology
Molecular function	transcription corepressor activity; ubiquitin-protein transferase regulator activity; protein kinase inhibitor activity; kinase activity; protein binding; mitogen-activated protein kinase kinase binding; ATP binding; protein kinase binding; ubiquitin protein ligase binding
Cellular component	cytosol; plasma membrane; nucleus
Biological process	negative regulation of fat cell differentiation; regulation of transcription, DNA-templated; negative regulation of fatty acid biosynthetic process; negative regulation of protein kinase activity; negative regulation of transcription by RNA polymerase II; transcription, DNA-templated; response to endoplasmic reticulum stress; protein phosphorylation; intrinsic apoptotic signaling pathway in response to endoplasmic reticulum stress; positive regulation of ubiquitin-protein transferase activity; cellular response to insulin stimulus; regulation of MAP kinase activity; positive regulation of protein binding; negative regulation of transcription, DNA-templated; regulation of glucose transmembrane transport; positive regulation of proteasomal ubiquitin-dependent protein catabolic process; apoptotic process; regulation of lipid metabolic process; negative regulation of protein kinase B signaling; regulation of autophagy
Sources:Amigo / QuickGO
Orthologs
Databases	NCBI: entry; OMA: entry
Species	Human	Mouse
Entrez	57761	228775
Ensembl	ENSG00000101255	ENSMUSG00000032715
UniProt	Q96RU7	Q8K4K2
RefSeq (mRNA)	NM_021158; NM_001301188; NM_001301190; NM_001301193; NM_001301196 NM_001301201	NM_144554; NM_175093
RefSeq (protein)	NP_001288117; NP_001288119; NP_001288122; NP_001288125; NP_001288130 NP_066981	NP_780302
Location (UCSC)	Chr 20: 0.36 – 0.4 Mb	Chr 2: 152.18 – 152.19 Mb
PubMed search
- Wikidata
View/Edit Human	View/Edit Mouse

Tribbles homolog 3 is a protein that in humans is encoded by the TRIB3 gene.

== Function ==
The protein encoded by this gene is a putative protein kinase that is induced by the transcription factor NF-kappaB. It is a pseudoenzyme that is thought to be a negative regulator of NF-kappaB, and can also sensitize cells to TNF- and TRAIL-induced apoptosis. In addition, this protein has been reported to negatively regulate the cell survival serine-threonine kinase AKT1. TRIB3 has recently been associated with neuronal signalling, and like TRIB1 and TRIB2, could be considered as a potential allosteric drug target.

== Interactions ==
TRIB3 has been shown to interact with:

- AKT1,
- CSNK2B,
- Fibronectin
- MCM3AP,
- RELA,
- SIAH1, and
- TIAF1.
