= MCM3 =

Protein-coding gene in humans

Identifiers
- Aliases: MCM3, HCC5, P1-P1.h, RLFB, minichromosome maintenance complex component 3
- External IDs: OMIM: 602693; MGI: 101845; GeneCards: MCM3
Enzyme activity
EC #	BRENDA	ExPASy	KEGG	MetaCyc
3.6.4.12	↗	↗	↗	↗

Gene location (Human)
Chr.	Chromosome 6 (human)
Band	6p12.2	Start	52,264,009 bp
Band	6p12.2	End	52,284,881 bp

Gene location (Mouse)
Chr.	Chromosome 1 (mouse)
Band	1|1 A4	Start	20,873,192 bp
Band	1|1 A4	End	20,890,536 bp
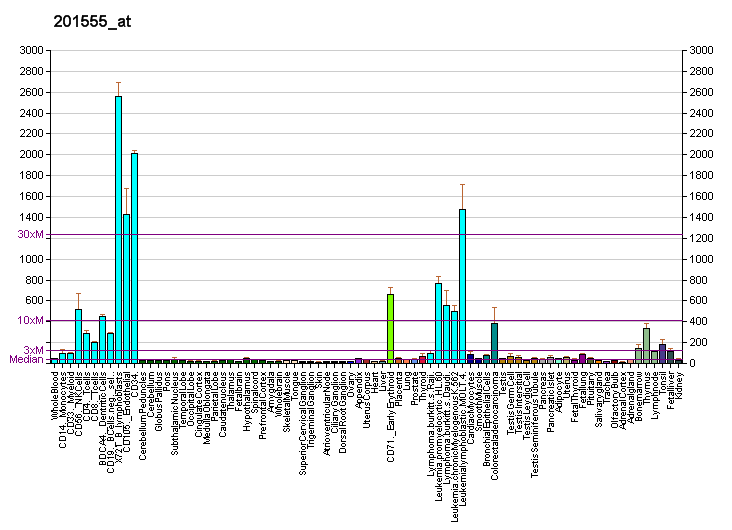
RNA expression pattern
Bgee	Human / Mouse (ortholog); Top expressed in: ventricular zone; embryo; ganglionic eminence; mucosa of transverse colon; appendix; rectum; lymph node; gonad; trabecular bone; body of uterus / Top expressed in: somite; epiblast; mandibular prominence; fetal liver hematopoietic progenitor cell; maxillary prominence; ventricular zone; primitive streak; tail of embryo; otic placode; abdominal wall; More reference expression data
BioGPS	More reference expression data
Gene ontology
Molecular function	DNA binding; nucleotide binding; helicase activity; protein binding; hydrolase activity; ATP binding; DNA replication origin binding; single-stranded DNA binding
Cellular component	cytoplasm; centrosome; membrane; nucleoplasm; perinuclear region of cytoplasm; alpha DNA polymerase:primase complex; MCM complex; nucleus; nucleolus; intracellular membrane-bounded organelle
Biological process	G1 phase; DNA replication; DNA replication initiation; cell cycle; G1/S transition of mitotic cell cycle; double-strand break repair via break-induced replication; pre-replicative complex assembly involved in nuclear cell cycle DNA replication; DNA strand elongation involved in DNA replication; mitotic DNA replication initiation
Sources:Amigo / QuickGO
Orthologs
Databases	NCBI: entry; OMA: entry
Species	Human	Mouse
Entrez	4172	17215
Ensembl	ENSG00000112118	ENSMUSG00000041859
UniProt	P25205; Q7Z6P5	P25206
RefSeq (mRNA)	NM_002388; NM_001270472	NM_008563
RefSeq (protein)	NP_001257401; NP_002379; NP_001353298; NP_001353299; NP_001353300 NP_001353301; NP_001353302; NP_001353303; NP_001353304	NP_032589
Location (UCSC)	Chr 6: 52.26 – 52.28 Mb	Chr 1: 20.87 – 20.89 Mb
PubMed search
- Wikidata
View/Edit Human	View/Edit Mouse

DNA replication licensing factor MCM3 is a protein that in humans is encoded by the MCM3 gene.

== Function ==
The protein encoded by this gene is one of the highly conserved mini-chromosome maintenance proteins (MCM) that are involved in the initiation of eukaryotic genome replication. The hexameric protein complex formed by MCM proteins is a key component of the pre-replication complex (pre-RC) and may be involved in the formation of replication forks and in the recruitment of other DNA replication related proteins. This protein is a subunit of the protein complex that consists of MCM2-7. It has been shown to interact directly with MCM5/CDC46. This protein also interacts with, and thus is acetylated by MCM3AP, a chromatin-associated acetyltransferase. The acetylation of this protein inhibits the initiation of DNA replication and cell cycle progression.

== Interactions ==
MCM3 has been shown to interact with:

- CDC45-related protein,
- CDC6,
- DBF4,
- MCM2
- MCM3AP,
- MCM5,
- MCM7,
- ORC4L, and
- ORC5L.

== See also ==
- Mini Chromosome Maintenance
