= MCM3AP =

Protein-coding gene in the species Homo sapiens

Identifiers
- Aliases: MCM3AP, GANP, MAP80, SAC3, minichromosome maintenance complex component 3 associated protein, PNRIID
- External IDs: OMIM: 603294; MGI: 1930089; GeneCards: MCM3AP
Available structures
PDB	Ortholog search: PDBe RCSB
PDB	List of PDB id codes 4DHX
Enzyme activity
EC #	BRENDA	ExPASy	KEGG	MetaCyc
2.3.1.48	↗	↗	↗	↗

Gene location (Human)
Chr.	Chromosome 21 (human)
Band	21q22.3	Start	46,235,133 bp
Band	21q22.3	End	46,286,297 bp

Gene location (Mouse)
Chr.	Chromosome 10 (mouse)
Band	10|10 C1	Start	76,304,761 bp
Band	10|10 C1	End	76,351,691 bp
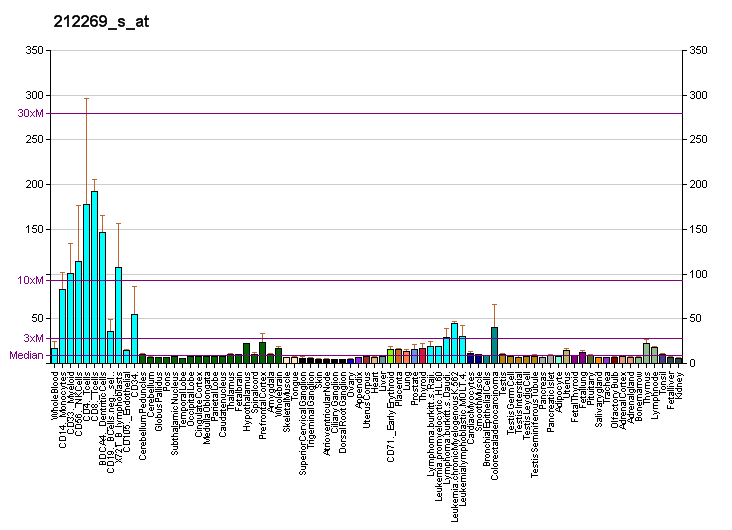

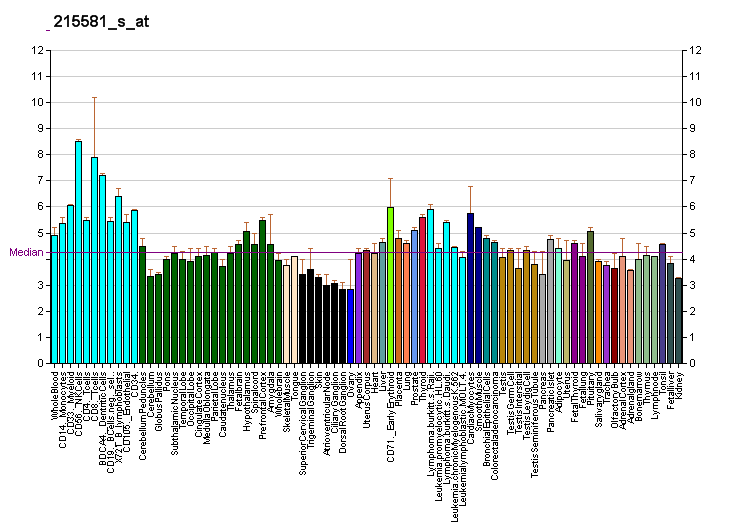
RNA expression pattern
Bgee	Human / Mouse (ortholog); Top expressed in: tendon of biceps brachii; tibial nerve; right uterine tube; gastrocnemius muscle; body of uterus; gastric mucosa; right ovary; right lobe of thyroid gland; cerebellar hemisphere; right hemisphere of cerebellum / Top expressed in: saccule; otic vesicle; zygote; primary oocyte; otic placode; secondary oocyte; Rostral migratory stream; granulocyte; renal corpuscle; ventricular zone; More reference expression data
BioGPS	More reference expression data
Gene ontology
Molecular function	transferase activity; DNA binding; acyltransferase activity; nucleic acid binding; chromatin binding; histone acetyltransferase activity; protein binding; H3 histone acetyltransferase activity; histone binding
Cellular component	cytosol; nuclear pore; nuclear membrane; nuclear envelope; nucleus; nucleoplasm; cytoplasm; transcription export complex 2; nuclear pore nuclear basket; chromosome
Biological process	protein transport; mRNA transport; protein import into nucleus; immune system process; transport; mRNA export from nucleus; poly(A)+ mRNA export from nucleus; somatic hypermutation of immunoglobulin genes; histone acetylation; nucleosome organization; histone H3 acetylation
Sources:Amigo / QuickGO
Orthologs
Databases	NCBI: entry; OMA: entry
Species	Human	Mouse
Entrez	8888	54387
Ensembl	ENSG00000160294	ENSMUSG00000001150
UniProt	O60318	Q9WUU9
RefSeq (mRNA)	NM_003906	NM_019434
RefSeq (protein)	NP_003897	NP_062307
Location (UCSC)	Chr 21: 46.24 – 46.29 Mb	Chr 10: 76.3 – 76.35 Mb
PubMed search
- Wikidata
View/Edit Human	View/Edit Mouse

80 kDa MCM3-associated protein is a protein that in humans is encoded by the MCM3AP gene.

== Function ==
The minichromosome maintenance protein 3 (MCM3) is one of the MCM proteins essential for the initiation of DNA replication. The protein encoded by this gene is an MCM3 binding protein. It was reported to have phosphorylation-dependent DNA-primase activity, which was up-regulated in antigen immunization induced germinal center. This protein was demonstrated to be an acetyltransferase that acetylates MCM3 and plays a role in DNA replication. The mutagenesis of a nuclear localization signal of MCM3 affects the binding of this protein with MCM3, suggesting that this protein may also facilitate MCM3 nuclear localization.

== Interactions ==
MCM3AP has been shown to interact with:

- MCM3 and
- TRIB3.
