= ASF1 like histone chaperone =

ASF1_hist_chap
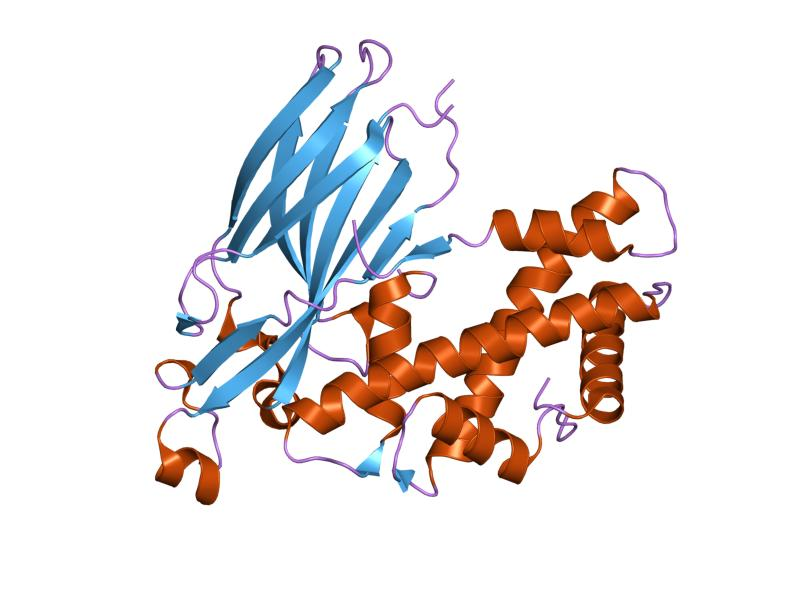
- crystal structure of the cia- histone h3-h4 complex

Identifiers
- Symbol: ASF1_hist_chap
- Pfam: PF04729
- Pfam clan: CL0463
- InterPro: IPR006818
- SCOP2: 1roc / SCOPe / SUPFAM
Available protein structures:
- Pfam: structures / ECOD
- PDB: RCSB PDB; PDBe; PDBj
- PDBsum: structure summary

In molecular biology, the ASF1 like histone chaperone family of proteins includes the yeast and human ASF1 proteins. These proteins are of the chaperone protein group and in particular can be placed into the histone chaperone subgroup. ASF1 participates in both the replication-dependent and replication-independent pathways. The three-dimensional structure has been determined as a compact immunoglobulin-like beta sandwich fold topped by three helical linkers.
