= Eukaryotic DNA replication =

DNA replication in eukaryotic organisms

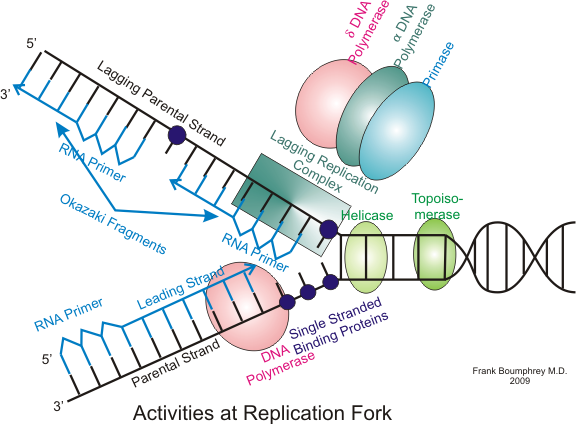
Eukaryotic DNA replication

Eukaryotic DNA replication is a conserved mechanism that restricts DNA replication to once per cell cycle. Eukaryotic DNA replication of chromosomal DNA is central for the duplication of a cell and is necessary for the maintenance of the eukaryotic genome.

DNA replication is the action of DNA polymerases synthesizing a DNA strand complementary to the original template strand. To synthesize DNA, the double-stranded DNA is unwound by DNA helicases ahead of polymerases, forming a replication fork containing two single-stranded templates. Replication processes permit copying a single DNA double helix into two DNA helices, which are divided into the daughter cells at mitosis. The major enzymatic functions carried out at the replication fork are well conserved from prokaryotes to eukaryotes, but the replication machinery in eukaryotic DNA replication is a much larger complex, coordinating many proteins at the site of replication, forming the replisome.

The replisome is responsible for copying the entirety of genomic DNA in each proliferative cell. This process allows for the high-fidelity passage of hereditary/genetic information from parental cell to daughter cell and is thus essential to all organisms. Much of the cell cycle is built around ensuring that DNA replication occurs without errors.

In G_{1} phase of the cell cycle, many of the DNA replication regulatory processes are initiated. In eukaryotes, the vast majority of DNA synthesis occurs during S phase of the cell cycle, and the entire genome must be unwound and duplicated to form two daughter copies. During G_{2}, any damaged DNA or replication errors are corrected. Finally, one copy of the genomes is segregated into each daughter cell at the mitosis or M phase. These daughter copies each contains one strand from the parental duplex DNA and one nascent antiparallel strand.

This mechanism is conserved from prokaryotes to eukaryotes and is known as semiconservative DNA replication. The process of semiconservative replication for the site of DNA replication is a fork-like DNA structure, the replication fork, where the DNA helix is open, or unwound, exposing unpaired DNA nucleotides for recognition and base pairing for the incorporation of free nucleotides into double-stranded DNA.

== Initiation ==
Initiation of eukaryotic DNA replication is the first stage of DNA synthesis where the DNA double helix is unwound and an initial priming event by DNA polymerase α occurs on the leading strand. The priming event on the lagging strand establishes a replication fork. Priming of the DNA helix consists of the synthesis of an RNA primer to allow DNA synthesis by DNA polymerase α. Priming occurs once at the origin on the leading strand and at the start of each Okazaki fragment on the lagging strand.

=== Origin of replication ===
Replication starts at origins of replication. DNA sequences containing these sites were initially isolated in the late 1970s on the basis of their ability to support replication of plasmids, hence the designation of autonomously replicating sequences (ARS). Origins vary widely in their efficiency, with some being used in almost every cell cycle while others may be used in only one in one thousand S phases. The total number of yeast ARSs is at least 1600, but may be more than 5000 if less active sites are counted, that is, there may be an ARS every 2000 to 8000 base pairs.

=== Pre-replicative complex ===
Multiple replicative proteins assemble on and dissociate from these replicative origins to initiate DNA replication. with the formation of the pre-replication complex (pre-RC) being a key intermediate in the replication initiation process.

Association of the origin recognition complex (ORC) with a replication origin recruits the cell division cycle 6 protein (Cdc6) to form a platform for the loading of the minichromosome maintenance (Mcm 2–7) complex proteins, facilitated by the chromatin licensing and DNA replication factor 1 protein (Cdt1). The ORC, Cdc6, and Cdt1 together are required for the stable association of the Mcm2-7 complex with replicative origins during the G_{1} phase of the cell cycle.

Eukaryotic origins of replication control the formation of several protein complexes that lead to the assembly of two bidirectional DNA replication forks. These events are initiated by the formation of the pre-replication complex (pre-RC) at the origins of replication. This process takes place in the G_{1} stage of the cell cycle. The pre-RC formation involves the ordered assembly of many replication factors including the origin recognition complex (ORC), Cdc6 protein, Cdt1 protein, and minichromosome maintenance proteins (Mcm2-7). Once the pre-RC is formed, activation of the complex is triggered by two kinases, cyclin-dependent kinase 2 (CDK) and Dbf4-dependent kinase (DDK) that help transition the pre-RC to the initiation complex before the initiation of DNA replication. This transition involves the ordered assembly of additional replication factors to unwind the DNA and accumulate the multiple eukaryotic DNA polymerases around the unwound DNA. Central to the question of how bidirectional replication forks are established at replication origins is the mechanism by which ORC recruits two head-to-head Mcm2-7 complexes to every replication origin to form the pre-replication complex.

==== Origin recognition complex ====
The first step in the assembly of the pre-replication complex (pre-RC) is the binding of the origin recognition complex (ORC) to the replication origin. In late mitosis, the Cdc6 protein joins the bound ORC followed by binding the Cdt1-Mcm2-7 complex. ORC, Cdc6, and Cdt1 are all required to load the six protein minichromosome maintenance (Mcm 2–7) complex onto the DNA. The ORC is a six-subunit, Orc1p-6, protein complex that selects the replicative origin sites on DNA for initiation of replication and ORC binding to chromatin is regulated through the cell cycle. Generally, the function and size of the ORC subunits are conserved throughout many eukaryotic genomes with the difference being their diverged DNA binding sites.

The most widely studied origin recognition complex is that of Saccharomyces cerevisiae or yeast which is known to bind to the autonomously replicating sequence (ARS). The S. cerevisiae ORC interacts specifically with both the A and B1 elements of yeast origins of replication, spanning a region of 30 base pairs. The binding to these sequences requires ATP.

The atomic structure of the S. cerevisiae ORC bound to ARS DNA has been determined. Orc1, Orc2, Orc3, Orc4, and Orc5 encircle the A element by means of two types of interactions, base non-specific and base-specific, that bend the DNA at the A element. All five subunits contact the sugar phosphate backbone at multiple points of the A element to form a tight grip without base specificity. Orc1 and Orc2 contact the minor groove of the A element while a winged helix domain of Orc4 contacts the methyl groups of the invariant Ts in the major groove of the A element via an insertion helix (IH). The absence of this IH in metazoans explains the lack of sequence specificity in human ORC. Removing the IH from the ScORC causes it to lose its specificity for the A element, and to bind promiscuously and preferentially (83%) to promoter regions. The ARS DNA is also bent at the B1 element through interactions with Orc2, Orc5 and Orc6. The bending of origin DNA by ORC appears to be evolutionarily conserved suggesting that it may be required for the Mcm2-7 complex loading mechanism.

When the ORC binds to DNA at replication origins, it serves as a scaffold for the assembly of other key initiation factors of the pre-replicative complex. This pre-replicative complex assembly during the G_{1} stage of the cell cycle is required prior to the activation of DNA replication during the S phase. The removal of at least part of the complex (Orc1) from the chromosome at metaphase is part of the regulation of mammalian ORC to ensure that the pre-replicative complex formation prior to the completion of metaphase is eliminated.

==== Cdc6 protein ====
Binding of the cell division cycle 6 (Cdc6) protein to the origin recognition complex (ORC) is an essential step in the assembly of the pre-replication complex (pre-RC) at the origins of replication. Cdc6 binds to the ORC on DNA in an ATP-dependent manner, which induces a change in the pattern of origin binding that requires Orc1 ATPase. Cdc6 requires ORC in order to associate with chromatin and is in turn required for the Cdt1-Mcm2-7 heptamer to bind to the chromatin. The ORC-Cdc6 complex forms a ring-shaped structure and is analogous to other ATP-dependent protein machines. The levels and activity of Cdc6 regulate the frequency with which the origins of replication are utilized during the cell cycle.

==== Cdt1 protein ====
The chromatin licensing and DNA replication factor 1 (Cdt1) protein is required for the licensing of chromatin for DNA replication. In S. cerevisiae, Cdt1 facilitates the loading of the Mcm2-7 complex one at a time onto the chromosome by stabilising the left-handed open-ring structure of the Mcm2-7 single hexamer. Cdt1 has been shown to associate with the C terminus of Cdc6 to cooperatively promote the association of Mcm proteins to the chromatin. The cryo-EM structure of the OCCM (ORC-Cdc6-Cdt1-MCM) complex shows that the Cdt1-CTD interacts with the Mcm6-WHD. In metazoans, Cdt1 activity during the cell cycle is tightly regulated by its association with the protein geminin, which both inhibits Cdt1 activity during S phase in order to prevent re-replication of DNA and prevents it from ubiquitination and subsequent proteolysis.

==== Minichromosome maintenance protein complex ====
The minichromosome maintenance (Mcm) proteins were named after a genetic screen for DNA replication initiation mutants in S. cerevisiae that affect plasmid stability in an ARS-specific manner. Mcm2, Mcm3, Mcm4, Mcm5, Mcm6 and Mcm7 form a hexameric complex that has an open-ring structure with a gap between Mcm2 and Mcm5. The assembly of the Mcm proteins onto chromatin requires the coordinated function of the origin recognition complex (ORC), Cdc6, and Cdt1. Once the Mcm proteins have been loaded onto the chromatin, ORC and Cdc6 can be removed from the chromatin without preventing subsequent DNA replication. This observation suggests that the primary role of the pre-replication complex is to correctly load the Mcm proteins.

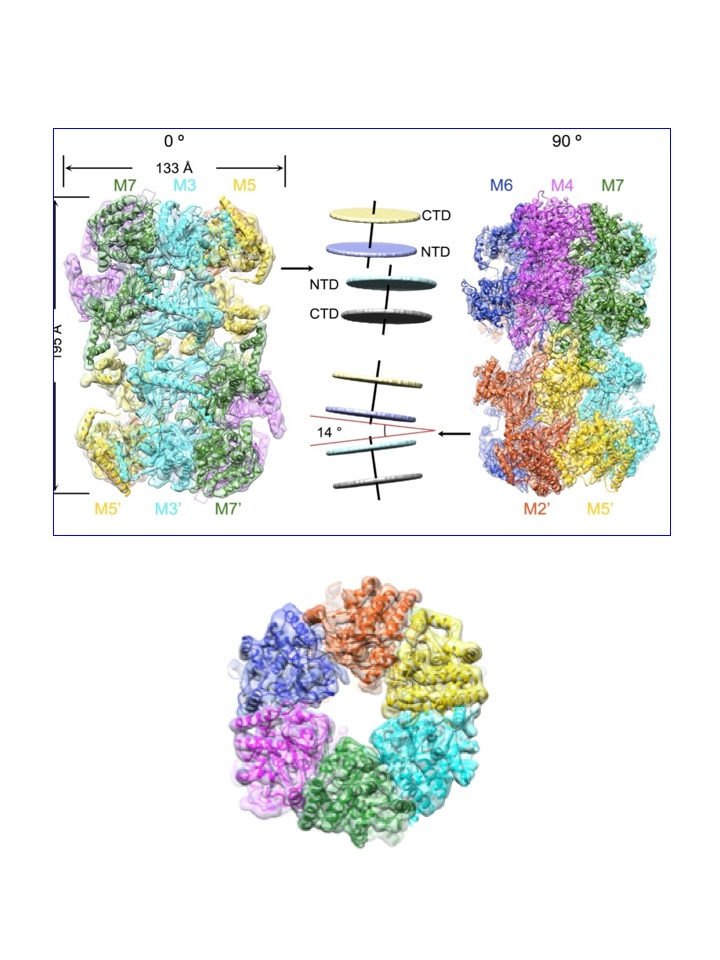
The Mcm2-7 double hexamer arranged in a head-to-head (NTD-to-NTD) orientation. Each hexameric ring is slightly tilted, twisted and off-centred relative to each other. Top panel, side views. Bottom panel, CTD view.

The Mcm proteins on chromatin form a head-to-head double hexamer with the two rings slightly tilted, twisted and off-centred to create a kink in the central channel where the bound DNA is captured at the interface of the two rings. Each hexameric Mcm2-7 ring first serves as the scaffold for the assembly of the replisome and then as the core of the catalytic CMG (Cdc45-MCM-GINS) helicase, which is a main component of the replisome. Each Mcm protein is highly related to all others, but unique sequences distinguishing each of the subunit types are conserved across eukaryotes. All eukaryotes have exactly six Mcm protein analogs that each fall into one of the existing classes (Mcm2-7), indicating that each Mcm protein has a unique and important function.

Minichromosome maintenance proteins are required for DNA helicase activity. Inactivation of any of the six Mcm proteins during S phase irreversibly prevents further progression of the replication fork suggesting that the helicase cannot be recycled and must be assembled at replication origins. Along with the minichromosome maintenance protein complex helicase activity, the complex also has associated ATPase activity. Studies have shown that within the Mcm protein complex are specific catalytic pairs of Mcm proteins that function together to coordinate ATP hydrolysis. These studies, confirmed by cryo-EM structures of the Mcm2-7 complexes, showed that the Mcm complex is a hexamer with subunits arranged in a ring in the order of Mcm2-Mcm6-Mcm4-Mcm7-Mcm3-Mcm5-. Both members of each catalytic pair contribute to the conformation that allows ATP binding and hydrolysis and the mixture of active and inactive subunits presumably allows the Mcm hexameric complex to complete ATP binding and hydrolysis as a whole to create a coordinated ATPase activity.

The nuclear localization of the minichromosome maintenance proteins is regulated in budding yeast cells. The Mcm proteins are present in the nucleus in G_{1} stage and S phase of the cell cycle, but are exported to the cytoplasm during the G_{2} stage and M phase. A complete and intact six subunit Mcm complex is required to enter into the cell nucleus. In S. cerevisiae, nuclear export is promoted by cyclin-dependent kinase (CDK) activity. Mcm proteins that are associated with chromatin are protected from CDK export machinery due to the lack of accessibility to CDK.

=== Initiation complex ===
During the G_{1} stage of the cell cycle, the replication initiation factors, origin recognition complex (ORC), Cdc6, Cdt1, and minichromosome maintenance (Mcm) protein complex, bind sequentially to DNA to form a head-to-head dimer of the MCM ring complex, known as the pre-replication complex (pre-RC). While the yeast pre-RC forms a closed DNA complex, the human pre-RC forms an open complex. At the transition of the G_{1} stage to the S phase of the cell cycle, S phase–specific cyclin-dependent protein kinase (CDK) and Cdc7/Dbf4 kinase (DDK) transform the inert pre-RC into an active complex capable of assembling two bidirectional replisomes. CryoEM structures showed that two DDKs independently dock onto the interface of the MCM double hexamer straddling across the two rings. The sequential phosphorylation of multiple substrates on the NTEs of Mcm4, Mcm2 and Mcm6 is achieved by a wobble mechanism whereby Dbf4 assumes different wobble states to position Cdc7 over its multiple substrates. Phosphorylation of the MCM double hexamer, the Mcm4-NSD in particular, by DDK is essential for viability in yeast. The recruitment of Cdc45 and GINS follows after the activation of the MCMs by DDK and CDK.

==== Cdc45 protein ====
Cell division cycle 45 (Cdc45) protein is a critical component for the conversion of the pre-replicative complex to the initiation complex. The Cdc45 protein assembles at replication origins before initiation and is required for replication to begin in Saccharomyces cerevisiae, and has an essential role during elongation. Thus, Cdc45 has central roles in both initiation and elongation phases of chromosomal DNA replication.

Cdc45 associates with chromatin after the beginning of initiation in late G_{1} stage and during the S phase of the cell cycle. Cdc45 physically associates with Mcm5 and displays genetic interactions with five of the six members of the Mcm gene family and the ORC2 gene. The loading of Cdc45 onto chromatin is critical for loading other various replication proteins, including DNA polymerase α, DNA polymerase ε, replication protein A (RPA) and proliferating cell nuclear antigen (PCNA) onto chromatin. Within a Xenopus nucleus-free system, it has been demonstrated that Cdc45 is required for the unwinding of plasmid DNA. The Xenopus nucleus-free system also demonstrates that DNA unwinding and tight RPA binding to chromatin occurs only in the presence of Cdc45.

Binding of Cdc45 to chromatin depends on Clb-Cdc28 kinase activity as well as functional Cdc6 and Mcm2, which suggests that Cdc45 associates with the pre-RC after activation of S-phase cyclin-dependent kinases (CDKs). As indicated by the timing and the CDK dependence, binding of Cdc45 to chromatin is crucial for commitment to initiation of DNA replication. During S phase, Cdc45 physically interacts with Mcm proteins on chromatin; however, dissociation of Cdc45 from chromatin is slower than that of the Mcm, which indicates that the proteins are released by different mechanisms.

==== GINS ====
The six minichromosome maintenance proteins and Cdc45 are essential during initiation and elongation for the movement of replication forks and for unwinding of the DNA. GINS are essential for the interaction of Mcm and Cdc45 at the origins of replication during initiation and then at DNA replication forks as the replisome progresses. The GINS complex is composed of four small proteins Sld5 (Cdc105), Psf1 (Cdc101), Psf2 (Cdc102) and Psf3 (Cdc103), GINS represents 'go, ichi, ni, san' which means '5, 1, 2, 3' in Japanese. Cdc45, Mcm2-7 and GINS together form the CMG helicase, the replicative helicase of the replisome. Although the Mcm2-7 complex alone has weak helicase activity Cdc45 and GINS are required for robust helicase activity

==== Mcm10 ====
Mcm10 is essential for chromosome replication and interacts with the minichromosome maintenance 2-7 helicase that is loaded in an inactive form at origins of DNA replication. Mcm10 also chaperones the catalytic DNA polymerase α and helps stabilize the polymerase at replication forks.

==== DDK and CDK kinases ====
At the onset of S phase, the pre-replicative complex must be activated by two S phase-specific kinases in order to form an initiation complex at an origin of replication. One kinase is the Cdc7-Dbf4 kinase called Dbf4-dependent kinase (DDK) and the other is cyclin-dependent kinase (CDK). Chromatin-binding assays of Cdc45 in yeast and Xenopus have shown that a downstream event of CDK action is loading of Cdc45 onto chromatin. Cdc6 has been speculated to be a target of CDK action, because of the association between Cdc6 and CDK, and the CDK-dependent phosphorylation of Cdc6. The CDK-dependent phosphorylation of Cdc6 has been considered to be required for entry into the S phase.

Both the catalytic subunits of DDK, Cdc7, and the activator protein, Dbf4, are conserved in eukaryotes and are required for the onset of S phase of the cell cycle. Both Dbf4 and Cdc7 are required for the loading of Cdc45 onto chromatin origins of replication. The target for binding of the DDK kinase is the chromatin-bound form of the Mcm complex. High resolution cryoEM structures showed that the Dbf4 subunit of DDK straddles across the hexamer interface of the DNA-bound MCM-DH, contacting Mcm2 of one hexamer and Mcm4/6 of the opposite hexamer. Mcm2, Mcm4 and Mcm6 are all substrates of phosphorylation by DDK but only the N-terminal serine/threonine-rich domain (NSD) of Mcm4 is an essential DDK target. Phosphorylation of the NSD leads to the activation of Mcm helicase activity.

==== Dpb11, Sld3, and Sld2 proteins ====
Sld3, Sld2, and Dpb11 interact with many replication proteins. Sld3 and Cdc45 form a complex that associated with the pre-RC at the early origins of replication even in the G1_{1} phase and with the later origins of replication in the S phase in a mutually Mcm-dependent manner. Dpb11 and Sld2 interact with Polymerase ɛ and cross-linking experiments have indicated that Dpb11 and Polymerase ɛ coprecipitate in the S phase and associate with replication origins.

Sld3 and Sld2 are phosphorylated by CDK, which enables the two replicative proteins to bind to Dpb11. Dpb11 had two pairs of BRCA1 C Terminus (BRCT) domains which are known as a phosphopeptide-binding domains. The N-terminal pair of the BRCT domains binds to phosphorylated Sld3, and the C-terminal pair binds to phosphorylated Sld2. Both of these interactions are essential for CDK-dependent activation of DNA budding in yeast.

Dpb11 also interacts with GINS and participates in the initiation and elongation steps of chromosomal DNA replication. GINS are one of the replication proteins found at the replication forks and forms a complex with Cdc45 and Mcm.

These phosphorylation-dependent interactions between Dpb11, Sld2, and Sld3 are essential for CDK-dependent activation of DNA replication, and by using cross-linking reagents within some experiments, a fragile complex was identified called the pre-loading complex (pre-LC). This complex contains Pol ɛ, GINS, Sld2, and Dpb11. The pre-LC is found to form before any association with the origins in a CDK-dependent and DDK-dependent manner and CDK activity regulates the initiation of DNA replication through the formation of the pre-LC.

== Elongation ==
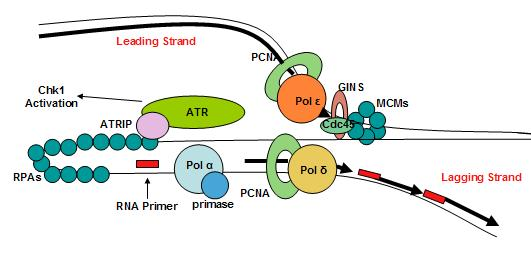
Eukaryotic replisome complex and associated proteins. A loop occurs in the lagging strand

The formation of the pre-replicative complex (pre-RC) marks the potential sites for the initiation of DNA replication. Consistent with the minichromosome maintenance complex encircling double stranded DNA, formation of the pre-RC does not lead to the immediate unwinding of origin DNA or the recruitment of DNA polymerases. Instead, the pre-RC that is formed during the G_{1} of the cell cycle is only activated to unwind the DNA and initiate replication after the cells pass from the G_{1} to the S phase of the cell cycle.

Once the initiation complex is formed and the cells pass into the S phase, the complex then becomes a replisome. The eukaryotic replisome complex is responsible for coordinating DNA replication. Replication on the leading and lagging strands is performed by DNA polymerase ε and DNA polymerase δ. Many replisome factors including Claspin, And1, replication factor C clamp loader and the fork protection complex are responsible for regulating polymerase functions and coordinating DNA synthesis with the unwinding of the template strand by Cdc45-Mcm-GINS complex. As the DNA is unwound the twist number decreases. To compensate for this the writhe number increases, introducing positive supercoils in the DNA. These supercoils would cause DNA replication to halt if they were not removed. Topoisomerases are responsible for removing these supercoils ahead of the replication fork.

The replisome is responsible for copying the entire genomic DNA in each proliferative cell. The base pairing and chain formation reactions, which form the daughter helix, are catalyzed by DNA polymerases. These enzymes move along single-stranded DNA and allow for the extension of the nascent DNA strand by "reading" the template strand and allowing for incorporation of the proper purine nucleobases, adenine and guanine, and pyrimidine nucleobases, thymine and cytosine. Activated free deoxyribonucleotides exist in the cell as deoxyribonucleotide triphosphates (dNTPs). These free nucleotides are added to an exposed 3'-hydroxyl group on the last incorporated nucleotide. In this reaction, a pyrophosphate is released from the free dNTP, generating energy for the polymerization reaction and exposing the 5' monophosphate, which is then covalently bonded to the 3' oxygen. Additionally, incorrectly inserted nucleotides can be removed and replaced by the correct nucleotides in an energetically favorable reaction. This property is vital to proper proofreading and repair of errors that occur during DNA replication.

=== Replication fork ===
The replication fork is the junction between the newly separated template strands, known as the leading and lagging strands, and the double stranded DNA. Since duplex DNA is antiparallel, DNA replication occurs in opposite directions between the two new strands at the replication fork, but all DNA polymerases synthesize DNA in the 5' to 3' direction with respect to the newly synthesized strand. Further coordination is required during DNA replication. Two replicative polymerases synthesize DNA in opposite orientations. Polymerase ε synthesizes DNA on the "leading" DNA strand continuously as it is pointing in the same direction as DNA unwinding by the replisome. In contrast, polymerase δ synthesizes DNA on the "lagging" strand, which is the opposite DNA template strand, in a fragmented or discontinuous manner.

The discontinuous stretches of DNA replication products on the lagging strand are known as Okazaki fragments and are about 100 to 200 bases in length at eukaryotic replication forks. The lagging strand usually contains longer stretches of single-stranded DNA that is coated with single-stranded binding proteins, which help stabilize the single-stranded templates by preventing a secondary structure formation. In eukaryotes, these single-stranded binding proteins are a heterotrimeric complex known as replication protein A (RPA).

Each Okazaki fragment is preceded by an RNA primer, which is displaced by the procession of the next Okazaki fragment during synthesis. RNase H recognizes the DNA:RNA hybrids that are created by the use of RNA primers and is responsible for removing these from the replicated strand, leaving behind a primer:template junction. DNA polymerase α, recognizes these sites and elongates the breaks left by primer removal. In eukaryotic cells, a small amount of the DNA segment immediately upstream of the RNA primer is also displaced, creating a flap structure. This flap is then cleaved by endonucleases. At the replication fork, the gap in DNA after removal of the flap is sealed by DNA ligase I, which repairs the nicks that are left between the 3'-OH and 5'phosphate of the newly synthesized strand. Owing to the relatively short nature of the eukaryotic Okazaki fragment, DNA replication synthesis occurring discontinuously on the lagging strand is less efficient and more time-consuming than leading-strand synthesis. DNA synthesis is complete once all RNA primers are removed and nicks are repaired.

Depiction of DNA replication at replication fork. a: template strands, b: leading strand, c: lagging strand, d: replication fork, e: RNA primer, f: Okazaki fragment

==== Leading strand ====
During DNA replication, the replisome will unwind the parental duplex DNA into a two single-stranded DNA template replication fork in a 5' to 3' direction. The leading strand is the newly synthesized strand that is being replicated in the same direction as the movement of the replication fork. This newly synthesized strand complementary to the original strand is synthesized in 5' to 3' in the same direction as the movement of the replication fork.

Once an RNA primer has been added by a primase to the 3' end of the leading strand, DNA synthesis will continue in a 3' to 5' direction with respect to the leading strand uninterrupted. DNA Polymerase ε will continuously add nucleotides to the template strand therefore making leading strand synthesis require only one primer and has uninterrupted DNA polymerase activity.

==== Lagging strand ====
DNA replication on the lagging strand is discontinuous. In lagging strand synthesis, the movement of DNA polymerase in the opposite direction of the replication fork requires the use of multiple RNA primers. DNA polymerase will synthesize short fragments of DNA called Okazaki fragments which are added to the 3' end of the primer. These fragments can be anywhere between 100 and 400 nucleotides long in eukaryotes.

At the end of Okazaki fragment synthesis, DNA polymerase δ runs into the previous Okazaki fragment and displaces its 5' end containing the RNA primer and a small segment of DNA. This generates an RNA-DNA single strand flap, which must be cleaved, and the nick between the two Okazaki fragments must be sealed by DNA ligase I. This process is known as Okazaki fragment maturation and can be handled in two ways: one mechanism processes short flaps, while the other deals with long flaps. DNA polymerase δ is able to displace up to 2 to 3 nucleotides of DNA or RNA ahead of its polymerization, generating a short "flap" substrate for Fen1, which can remove nucleotides from the flap, one nucleotide at a time.

By repeating cycles of this process, DNA polymerase δ and Fen1 can coordinate the removal of RNA primers and leave a DNA nick at the lagging strand. It has been proposed that this iterative process is preferable to the cell because it is tightly regulated and does not generate large flaps that need to be excised. In the event of deregulated Fen1/DNA polymerase δ activity, the cell uses an alternative mechanism to generate and process long flaps by using Dna2, which has both helicase and nuclease activities. The nuclease activity of Dna2 is required for removing these long flaps, leaving a shorter flap to be processed by Fen1. Electron microscopy studies indicate that nucleosome loading on the lagging strand occurs very close to the site of synthesis. Thus, Okazaki fragment maturation is an efficient process that occurs immediately after the nascent DNA is synthesized.

=== Replicative DNA polymerases ===
After the replicative helicase has unwound the parental DNA duplex, exposing two single-stranded DNA templates, replicative polymerases are needed to generate two copies of the parental genome. DNA polymerase function is highly specialized and accomplish replication on specific templates and in narrow localizations. At the eukaryotic replication fork, there are three distinct replicative polymerase complexes that contribute to DNA replication: Polymerase α, Polymerase δ, and Polymerase ε. These three polymerases are essential for viability of the cell.

Because DNA polymerases require a primer on which to begin DNA synthesis, polymerase α (Pol α) acts as a replicative primase. Pol α is associated with an RNA primase and this complex accomplishes the priming task by synthesizing a primer that contains a short 10 nucleotide stretch of RNA followed by 10 to 20 DNA bases. Importantly, this priming action occurs at replication initiation at origins to begin leading-strand synthesis and also at the 5' end of each Okazaki fragment on the lagging strand.

However, Pol α is not able to continue DNA replication and must be replaced with another polymerase to continue DNA synthesis. Polymerase switching requires clamp loaders and it has been proven that normal DNA replication requires the coordinated actions of all three DNA polymerases: Pol α for priming synthesis, Pol ε for leading-strand replication, and the Pol δ, which is constantly loaded, for generating Okazaki fragments during lagging-strand synthesis.

- Polymerase α (Pol α): Forms a complex with a small catalytic subunit (PriS) and a large noncatalytic (PriL) subunit. First, synthesis of an RNA primer allows DNA synthesis by DNA polymerase alpha. Occurs once at the origin on the leading strand and at the start of each Okazaki fragment on the lagging strand. Pri subunits act as a primase, synthesizing an RNA primer. DNA Pol α elongates the newly formed primer with DNA nucleotides. After around 20 nucleotides, elongation is taken over by Pol ε on the leading strand and Pol δ on the lagging strand.
- Polymerase δ (Pol δ): Highly processive and has proofreading, 3'->5' exonuclease activity. In vivo, it is the main polymerase involved in both lagging strand and leading strand synthesis.
- Polymerase ε (Pol ε): Highly processive and has proofreading, 3'->5' exonuclease activity. Highly related to pol δ, in vivo it functions mainly in error checking of pol δ.

=== Cdc45–Mcm–GINS helicase complex ===
The DNA helicases and polymerases must remain in close contact at the replication fork. If unwinding occurs too far in advance of synthesis, large tracts of single-stranded DNA are exposed. This can activate DNA damage signaling or induce DNA repair processes. To thwart these problems, the eukaryotic replisome contains specialized proteins that are designed to regulate the helicase activity ahead of the replication fork. These proteins also provide docking sites for physical interaction between helicases and polymerases, thereby ensuring that duplex unwinding is coupled with DNA synthesis.

For DNA polymerases to function, the double-stranded DNA helix has to be unwound to expose two single-stranded DNA templates for replication. DNA helicases are responsible for unwinding the double-stranded DNA during chromosome replication. Helicases in eukaryotic cells are remarkably complex. The catalytic core of the helicase is composed of six minichromosome maintenance (Mcm2-7) proteins, forming a hexameric ring. Away from DNA, the Mcm2-7 proteins form a single heterohexamer and are loaded in an inactive form at origins of DNA replication as a head-to-head double hexamers around double-stranded DNA. The Mcm proteins are recruited to replication origins then redistributed throughout the genomic DNA during S phase, indicative of their localization to the replication fork.

Loading of Mcm proteins can only occur during the G_{1} of the cell cycle, and the loaded complex is then activated during S phase by recruitment of the Cdc45 protein and the GINS complex to form the active Cdc45–Mcm–GINS (CMG) helicase at DNA replication forks. Mcm activity is required throughout the S phase for DNA replication. A variety of regulatory factors assemble around the CMG helicase to produce the 'Replisome Progression Complex' which associates with DNA polymerases to form the eukaryotic replisome, the structure of which is still quite poorly defined in comparison with its bacterial counterpart.

The isolated CMG helicase and Replisome Progression Complex contain a single Mcm protein ring complex suggesting that the loaded double hexamer of the Mcm proteins at origins might be broken into two single hexameric rings as part of the initiation process, with each Mcm protein complex ring forming the core of a CMG helicase at the two replication forks established from each origin. The full CMG complex is required for DNA unwinding, and the complex of CDC45-Mcm-GINS is the functional DNA helicase in eukaryotic cells.

==== Ctf4 and And1 proteins ====
The CMG complex interacts with the replisome through the interaction with Ctf4 and And1 proteins. Ctf4/And1 proteins interact with both the CMG complex and DNA polymerase α. Ctf4 is a polymerase α accessory factor, which is required for the recruitment of polymerase α to replication origins.

==== Mrc1 and Claspin proteins ====
Mrc1/Claspin proteins couple leading-strand synthesis with the CMG complex helicase activity. Mrc1 interacts with polymerase ε as well as Mcm proteins. The importance of this direct link between the helicase and the leading-strand polymerase is underscored by results in cultured human cells, where Mrc1/Claspin is required for efficient replication fork progression. These results suggest that efficient DNA replication also requires the coupling of helicases and leading-strand synthesis...

=== Proliferating cell nuclear antigen ===
DNA polymerases require additional factors to support DNA replication. DNA polymerases have a semiclosed 'hand' structure, which allows the polymerase to load onto the DNA and begin translocating. This structure permits DNA polymerase to hold the single-stranded DNA template, incorporate dNTPs at the active site, and release the newly formed double-stranded DNA. However, the structure of DNA polymerases does not allow a continuous stable interaction with the template DNA.

To strengthen the interaction between the polymerase and the template DNA, DNA sliding clamps associate with the polymerase to promote the processivity of the replicative polymerase. In eukaryotes, the sliding clamp is a homotrimer ring structure known as the proliferating cell nuclear antigen (PCNA). The PCNA ring has polarity with surfaces that interact with DNA polymerases and tethers them securely to the DNA template. PCNA-dependent stabilization of DNA polymerases has a significant effect on DNA replication because PCNAs are able to enhance the polymerase processivity up to 1,000-fold. PCNA is an essential cofactor and has the distinction of being one of the most common interaction platforms in the replisome to accommodate multiple processes at the replication fork, and so PCNA is also viewed as a regulatory cofactor for DNA polymerases.

=== Replication factor C ===
PCNA fully encircles the DNA template strand and must be loaded onto DNA at the replication fork. At the leading strand, loading of the PCNA is an infrequent process, because DNA replication on the leading strand is continuous until replication is terminated. However, at the lagging strand, DNA polymerase δ needs to be continually loaded at the start of each Okazaki fragment. This constant initiation of Okazaki fragment synthesis requires repeated PCNA loading for efficient DNA replication.

PCNA loading is accomplished by the replication factor C (RFC) complex. The RFC complex is composed of five ATPases: Rfc1, Rfc2, Rfc3, Rfc4 and Rfc5. RFC recognizes primer-template junctions and loads PCNA at these sites. The PCNA homotrimer is opened by RFC by ATP hydrolysis and is then loaded onto DNA in the proper orientation to facilitate its association with the polymerase. Clamp loaders can also unload PCNA from DNA; a mechanism needed when replication must be terminated.

=== Stalled replication fork ===
DNA replication at the replication fork can be halted by a shortage of deoxynucleotide triphosphates (dNTPs) or by DNA damage, resulting in replication stress. This halting of replication is described as a stalled replication fork. A fork protection complex of proteins stabilizes the replication fork until DNA damage or other replication problems can be fixed. Prolonged replication fork stalling can lead to further DNA damage. Stalling signals are deactivated if the problems causing the replication fork are resolved.

== Termination ==
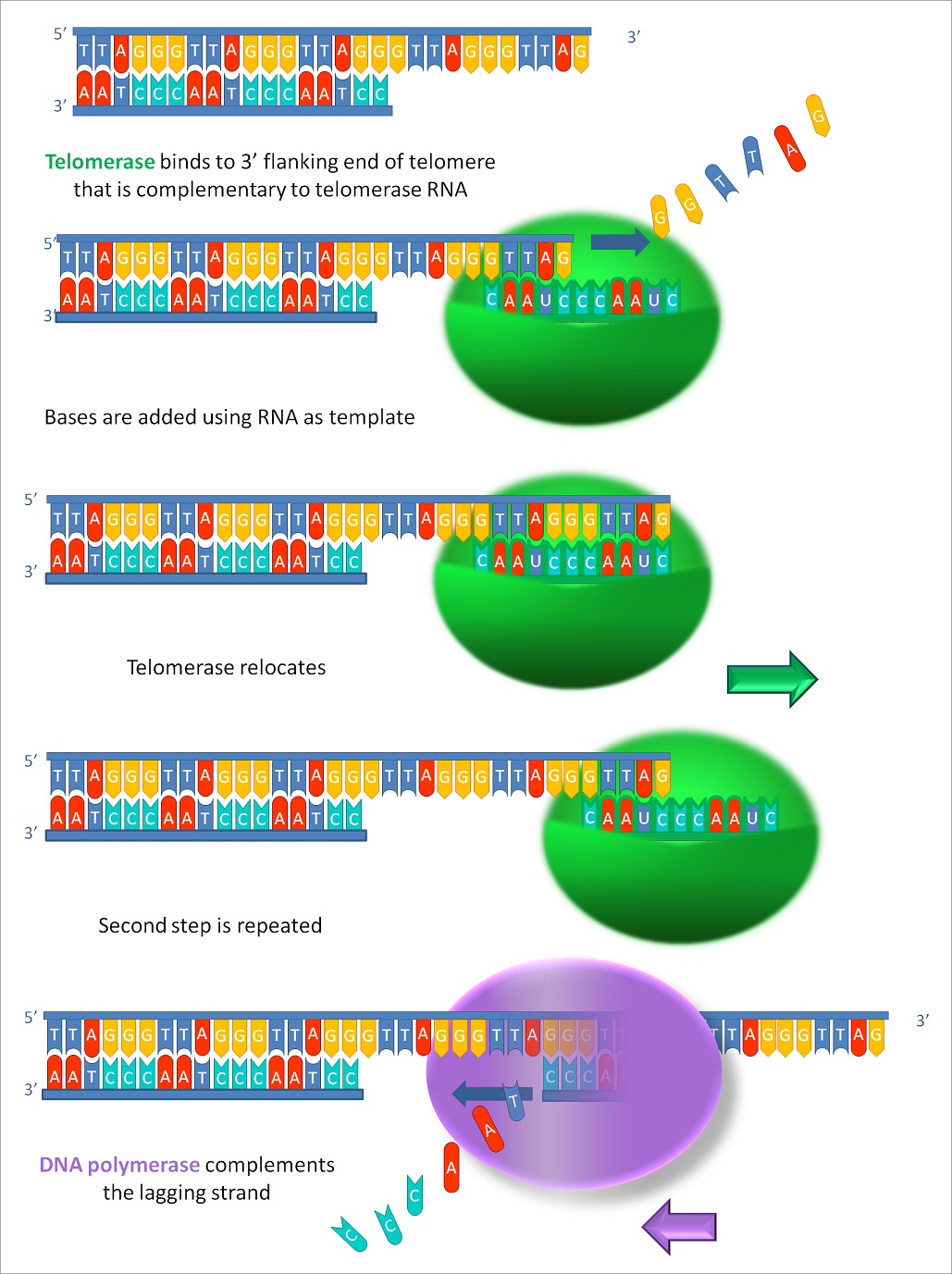
A depiction of telomerase progressively elongating telomeric DNA.

Termination of eukaryotic DNA replication requires different processes depending on whether the chromosomes are circular or linear. Unlike linear molecules, circular chromosomes are able to replicate the entire molecule. However, the two DNA molecules will remain linked together. This issue is handled by decatenation of the two DNA molecules by a type II topoisomerase. Type II topoisomerases are also used to separate linear strands as they are intricately folded into a nucleosome within the cell.

As previously mentioned, linear chromosomes face another issue that is not seen in circular DNA replication. Due to the fact that an RNA primer is required for initiation of DNA synthesis, the lagging strand is at a disadvantage in replicating the entire chromosome. While the leading strand can use a single RNA primer to extend the 5' terminus of the replicating DNA strand, multiple RNA primers are responsible for lagging strand synthesis, creating Okazaki fragments. This leads to an issue due to the fact that DNA polymerase is only able to add to the 3' end of the DNA strand. The 3'-5' action of DNA polymerase along the parent strand leaves a short single-stranded DNA (ssDNA) region at the 3' end of the parent strand when the Okazaki fragments have been repaired. Since replication occurs in opposite directions at opposite ends of parent chromosomes, each strand is a lagging strand at one end. Over time this would result in progressive shortening of both daughter chromosomes. This is known as the end replication problem.

The end replication problem is handled in eukaryotic cells by telomere regions and telomerase. Telomeres extend the 3' end of the parental chromosome beyond the 5' end of the daughter strand. This single-stranded DNA structure can act as an origin of replication that recruits telomerase. Telomerase is a specialized DNA polymerase that consists of multiple protein subunits and an RNA component. The RNA component of telomerase anneals to the single stranded 3' end of the template DNA and contains 1.5 copies of the telomeric sequence. Telomerase contains a protein subunit that is a reverse transcriptase called telomerase reverse transcriptase or TERT. TERT synthesizes DNA until the end of the template telomerase RNA and then disengages. This process can be repeated as many times as needed with the extension of the 3' end of the parental DNA molecule. This 3' addition provides a template for extension of the 5' end of the daughter strand by lagging strand DNA synthesis. Regulation of telomerase activity is handled by telomere-binding proteins.

=== Replication fork barriers ===
Prokaryotic DNA replication is bidirectional; within a replicative origin, replisome complexes are created at each end of the replication origin and replisomes move away from each other from the initial starting point. In prokaryotes, bidirectional replication initiates at one replicative origin on the circular chromosome and terminates at a site opposed from the initial start of the origin. These termination regions have DNA sequences known as Ter sites. These Ter sites are bound by the Tus protein. The Ter-Tus complex is able to stop helicase activity, terminating replication.

In eukaryotic cells, termination of replication usually occurs through the collision of the two replicative forks between two active replication origins. The location of the collision varies on the timing of origin firing. In this way, if a replication fork becomes stalled or collapses at a certain site, replication of the site can be rescued when a replisome traveling in the opposite direction completes copying the region. There are programmed replication fork barriers (RFBs) bound by RFB proteins in various locations, throughout the genome, which are able to terminate or pause replication forks, stopping progression of the replisome.

== Replication factories ==
It has been found that replication happens in a localised way in the cell nucleus. Contrary to the traditional view of moving replication forks along stagnant DNA, a concept of replication factories emerged, which means replication forks are concentrated towards some immobilised 'factory' regions through which the template DNA strands pass like conveyor belts.

== Cell cycle regulation ==
The cell cycle for eukaryotic cells.

DNA replication is a tightly orchestrated process that is controlled within the context of the cell cycle. Progress through the cell cycle and in turn DNA replication is tightly regulated by the formation and activation of pre-replicative complexes (pre-RCs) which is achieved through the activation and inactivation of cyclin-dependent kinases (Cdks, CDKs). Specifically it is the interactions of cyclins and cyclin dependent kinases that are responsible for the transition from G_{1} into S-phase.

During the G_{1} phase of the cell cycle there are low levels of CDK activity. This low level of CDK activity allows for the formation of new pre-RC complexes but is not sufficient for DNA replication to be initiated by the newly formed pre-RCs. During the remaining phases of the cell cycle there are elevated levels of CDK activity. This high level of CDK activity is responsible for initiating DNA replication as well as inhibiting new pre-RC complex formation. Once DNA replication has been initiated the pre-RC complex is broken down. Due to the fact that CDK levels remain high during the S phase, G_{2}, and M phases of the cell cycle no new pre-RC complexes can be formed. This all helps to ensure that no initiation can occur until the cell division is complete.

In addition to cyclin dependent kinases a new round of replication is thought to be prevented through the downregulation of Cdt1. This is achieved via degradation of Cdt1 as well as through the inhibitory actions of a protein known as geminin. Geminin binds tightly to Cdt1 and is thought to be the major inhibitor of re-replication. Geminin first appears in S-phase and is degraded at the metaphase-anaphase transition, possibly through ubiquination by anaphase promoting complex (APC).

Various cell cycle checkpoints are present throughout the course of the cell cycle that determine whether a cell will progress through division entirely. Importantly in replication the G_{1}, or restriction, checkpoint makes the determination of whether or not initiation of replication will begin or whether the cell will be placed in a resting stage known as G_{0}. Cells in the G_{0} stage of the cell cycle are prevented from initiating a round of replication because the minichromosome maintenance proteins are not expressed. Transition into the S-phase indicates replication has begun.

=== Replication checkpoint proteins ===
In order to preserve genetic information during cell division, DNA replication must be completed with high fidelity. In order to achieve this task, eukaryotic cells have proteins in place during certain points in the replication process that are able to detect any errors during DNA replication and are able to preserve genomic integrity. These checkpoint proteins are able to stop the cell cycle from entering mitosis in order to allow time for DNA repair. Checkpoint proteins are also involved in some DNA repair pathways, while they stabilize the structure of the replication fork to prevent further damage. These checkpoint proteins are essential to avoid passing down mutations or other chromosomal aberrations to offspring.

Eukaryotic checkpoint proteins are well conserved and involve two phosphatidylinositol 3-kinase-related kinases (PIKKs), ATR and ATM. Both ATR and ATM share a target phosphorylation sequence, the SQ/TQ motif, but their individual roles in cells differ.

ATR is involved in arresting the cell cycle in response to DNA double-stranded breaks. ATR has an obligate checkpoint partner, ATR-interacting-protein (ATRIP), and together these two proteins are responsive to stretches of single-stranded DNA that are coated by replication protein A (RPA). The formation of single-stranded DNA occurs frequently, more often during replication stress. ATR-ATRIP is able to arrest the cell cycle to preserve genome integrity. ATR is found on chromatin during S phase, similar to RPA and claspin.

The generation of single-stranded DNA tracts is important in initiating the checkpoint pathways downstream of replication damage. Once single-stranded DNA becomes sufficiently long, single-stranded DNA coated with RPA are able to recruit ATR-ATRIP. In order to become fully active, the ATR kinase rely on sensor proteins that sense whether the checkpoint proteins are localized to a valid site of DNA replication stress. The RAD9-HUS1-Rad1 (9-1-1) heterotrimeric clamp and its clamp loader RFC^{Rad17} are able to recognize gapped or nicked DNA. The RFC^{Rad17} clamp loader loads 9-1-1 onto the damaged DNA. The presence of 9-1-1 on DNA is enough to facilitate the interaction between ATR-ATRIP and a group of proteins termed checkpoint mediators, such as TOPBP1 and Mrc1/claspin. TOPBP1 interacts with and recruits the phosphorylated Rad9 component of 9-1-1 and binds ATR-ATRIP, which phosphorylates Chk1. Mrc1/Claspin is also required for the complete activation of ATR-ATRIP that phosphorylates Chk1, the major downstream checkpoint effector kinase. Claspin is a component of the replisome and contains a domain for docking with Chk1, revealing a specific function of Claspin during DNA replication: the promotion of checkpoint signaling at the replisome.

Chk1 signaling is vital for arresting the cell cycle and preventing cells from entering mitosis with incomplete DNA replication or DNA damage. The Chk1-dependent Cdk inhibition is important for the function of the ATR-Chk1 checkpoint and to arrest the cell cycle and allow sufficient time for completion of DNA repair mechanisms, which in turn prevents the inheritance of damaged DNA. In addition, Chk1-dependent Cdk inhibition plays a critical role in inhibiting origin firing during S phase. This mechanism prevents continued DNA synthesis and is required for the protection of the genome in the presence of replication stress and potential genotoxic conditions. Thus, ATR-Chk1 activity further prevents potential replication problems at the level of single replication origins by inhibiting initiation of replication throughout the genome, until the signaling cascade maintaining cell-cycle arrest is turned off.

== Replication through nucleosomes ==
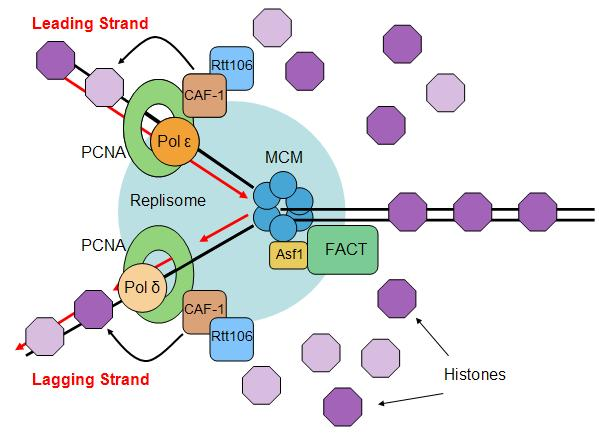
Depiction of replication through histones. Histones are removed from DNA by the FACT complex and Asf1. Histones are reassembled onto newly replicated DNA after the replication fork by CAF-1 and Rtt106.

Eukaryotic DNA must be tightly compacted in order to fit within the confined space of the nucleus. Chromosomes are packaged by wrapping 147 nucleotides around an octamer of histone proteins, forming a nucleosome. The nucleosome octamer includes two copies of each histone H2A, H2B, H3, and H4. Due to the tight association of histone proteins to DNA, eukaryotic cells have proteins that are designed to remodel histones ahead of the replication fork, in order to allow smooth progression of the replisome. There are also proteins involved in reassembling histones behind the replication fork to reestablish the nucleosome conformation.

There are several histone chaperones that are known to be involved in nucleosome assembly after replication. The FACT complex has been found to interact with DNA polymerase α-primase complex, and the subunits of the FACT complex interacted genetically with replication factors. The FACT complex is a heterodimer that does not hydrolyze ATP, but is able to facilitate "loosening" of histones in nucleosomes, but how the FACT complex is able to relieve the tight association of histones for DNA removal remains unanswered.

Another histone chaperone that associates with the replisome is Asf1, which interacts with the Mcm complex dependent on histone dimers H3-H4. Asf1 is able to pass newly synthesized H3-H4 dimer to deposition factors behind the replication fork and this activity makes the H3-H4 histone dimers available at the site of histone deposition just after replication. Asf1 (and its partner Rtt109) has also been implicated in inhibiting gene expression from replicated genes during S-phase.

The heterotrimeric chaperone chromatin assembly factor 1 (CAF-1) is a chromatin formation protein that is involved in depositing histones onto both newly replicated DNA strands to form chromatin. CAF-1 contains a PCNA-binding motif, called a PIP-box, that allows CAF-1 to associate with the replisome through PCNA and is able to deposit histone H3-H4 dimers onto newly synthesized DNA. The Rtt106 chaperone is also involved in this process, and associated with CAF-1 and H3-H4 dimers during chromatin formation. These processes load newly synthesized histones onto DNA.

After the deposition of histones H3-H4, nucleosomes form by the association of histone H2A-H2B. This process is thought to occur through the FACT complex, since it already associated with the replisome and is able to bind free H2A-H2B, or there is the possibility of another H2A-H2B chaperone, Nap1. Electron microscopy studies show that this occurs very quickly, as nucleosomes can be observed forming just a few hundred base pairs after the replication fork. Therefore, the entire process of forming new nucleosomes takes place just after replication due to the coupling of histone chaperones to the replisome.

== Mitotic DNA Synthesis ==
Mitotic DNA synthesis (MiDAS) is a process of irregular DNA replication where DNA synthesis, naturally occurring in the S phase, takes place in the M phase of the cell cycle. Mitotic DNA synthesis is known to occur when cells are experiencing stress related to DNA replication. Certain loci in the genome, considered common fragile sites (CFS) or ALT-associated replication defects can induce replication stress that may lead to MiDAS. Mitotic DNA synthesis is enabled by a protein known as RAD52, which then recruits enzymes, including MUS81 and POLD3. These enzymes work to promote MiDAS, operating outside of ATR, BRCA2, and RAD51 which are necessary to prevent replication stress at CFS loci throughout S phase. MiDAS has been recorded in mammals and yeast, however, its occurrence in other eukaryotic organisms is yet to be discovered.

== Comparisons between prokaryotic and eukaryotic DNA replication ==
When compared to prokaryotic DNA replication, namely in bacteria, the completion of eukaryotic DNA replication is more complex and involves multiple origins of replication and replicative proteins to accomplish. Prokaryotic DNA is arranged in a circular shape, and has only one replication origin when replication starts. By contrast, eukaryotic DNA is linear. When replicated, there are as many as one thousand origins of replication.

Eukaryotic DNA is bidirectional. Here the meaning of the word bidirectional is different. Eukaryotic linear DNA has many origins (called O) and termini (called T). "T" is present to the right of "O". One "O" and one "T" together form one replicon. After the formation of pre-initiation complex, when one replicon starts elongation, initiation starts in second replicon. Now, if the first replicon moves in clockwise direction, the second replicon moves in anticlockwise direction, until "T" of first replicon is reached. At "T", both the replicons merge to complete the process of replication. Meanwhile, the second replicon is moving in forward direction also, to meet with the third replicon. This clockwise and counter-clockwise movement of two replicons is termed as bidirectional replication.

Eukaryotic DNA replication requires precise coordination of all DNA polymerases and associated proteins to replicate the entire genome each time a cell divides. This process is achieved through a series of steps of protein assemblies at origins of replication, mainly focusing the regulation of DNA replication on the association of the MCM helicase with the DNA. These origins of replication direct the number of protein complexes that will form to initiate replication. In bacterial DNA replication, regulation focuses on the binding of the DnaA initiator protein to the DNA, with initiation of replication occurring multiple times during one cell cycle. Both prokaryotic and eukaryotic DNA use ATP binding and hydrolysis to direct helicase loading and in both cases the helicase is loaded in the inactive form. However, eukaryotic helicases are double hexamers that are loaded onto double stranded DNA whereas bacterial helicases are single hexamers loaded onto single stranded DNA.

Segregation of chromosomes is another difference between prokaryotic and eukaryotic cells. Rapidly dividing cells, such as bacteria, will often begin to segregate chromosomes that are still in the process of replication. In eukaryotic cells chromosome segregation into the daughter cells is not initiated until replication is complete in all chromosomes. Despite these differences, however, the underlying process of replication is similar for both prokaryotic and eukaryotic DNA.

Bacterial DNA replication	Eukaryotic DNA replication
Occurs inside the cytoplasm	Occurs inside the nucleus
Only one origin of replication per molecule of DNA	Have many origins of replication in each chromosome
Origin of replication is about 100-200 or more nucleotides in length	Each origin of replication is formed of about 150 nucleotides
Replication occurs at one point in each chromosome	Replication occurs at several points simultaneously in each chromosome
Only have one origin of replication	Has multiple origins of replication
Initiation is carried out by protein DnaA and DnaB	Initiation is carried out by the Origin Recognition Complex
Topoisomerase is needed	Topoisomerase is needed
Replication is very rapid	Replication is very slow

== Eukaryotic DNA replication protein list ==
List of major proteins involved in eukaryotic DNA replication:

Protein	Function in Eukaryotic DNA replication
AND1	Loads DNA polymerase α onto chromatin together with CMG complex on the lagging strand. Also known as Ctf4 in budding yeast.
Cdc45	Required for initiation and elongation steps of DNA replication. A part of the Mcm2-7 helicase complex. Required after pre-RC step for loading of various proteins for initiation and elongation.
Cdc45-Mcm-GINS (CMG) complex	Functional DNA helicase in eukaryotic cells
Cdc6	Required for assembly of Mcm2-7 complex at ORC, in conjunction with Cdt1 .
Cdc7-Dbf4 kinase or Dbf4-dependent kinase (DDK)	Protein kinase required for initiation of DNA replication, probably through phosphorylation of the minichromosome maintenance proteins.
Cdt1	Loads Mcm2-7 complex on DNA at ORC in pre-RC/licensing step. Inhibited in metazoans by geminin.
Claspin	Couple leading-strand synthesis with the CMG complex helicase activity. Works with Mrc1
Ctf4	Loads DNA polymerase α onto chromatin together with CMG complex on the lagging strand. Homolog in metazoans is known as AND-1.
Cyclin-dependent kinase (CDK)	Cyclin-dependent protein kinase required for initiation of replication and for other subsequent steps.
Dna2	5' flap endonuclease and helicase involved in processing Okazaki fragments.
DNA ligase I	Joins Okazaki fragments during DNA replication. Ligase activity also needed for DNA repair and recombination.
DNA polymerase α (Pol α)	Contains primase activity that is necessary to initiate DNA synthesis on both leading and lagging strands.
DNA polymerase δ (Pol δ)	Required to complete synthesis of Okazaki fragments on the lagging strand that have been started by DNA polymerase α.
DNA polymerase ε (Pol ε)	The leading strand polymerase. Synthesizes DNA at the replication fork. Binds early at origins via Dbp11 and needed to load DNA polymerase α.
Dpb11	DNA replication initiation protein. Loads DNA polymerase ε onto pre-replication complexes at origins.
Fen1	5' flap endonuclease involved in processing Okazaki fragments.
Geminin	Protein found in metazoans and absent from yeasts. Binds to and inactivates Cdt1, thereby regulating pre-replicative/initiation complex formation. Also suggested to promote pre-RC formation by binding and thus preventing Cdt1 degradation
GINS	Tetrameric complex composed of Sld5, Psf1, Psf2, Psf3. Associates with pre-replicative complex around the time of initiation and moves with replication forks during elongation step. Required for elongation stage of DNA replication and maybe part of the Mcm helicase complex.
Minichromosome maintenance proteins (Mcm)	Six different proteins of the AAA+ ATPase family that form a hexamer in solution. This hexamer is recruited and loaded by ORC, Cdc6 and Cdt1 and forms a double hexamer that is topologically linked around DNA to form a salt-resistant pre-replicative complex. On replication initiation, Mcm2-7 moves away from ORC with replication fork.
Mcm10	Required for initiation and elongation stages of DNA replication. Implicated in chromatin binding of Cdc45 and DNA polymerase α. Also required for stability of DNA polymerase α catalytic subunit in the budding yeast S. cerevisiae.
Mrc1	Couple leading-strand synthesis with the CMG complex helicase activity. Metazoan homolog is known as Claspin.
Origin recognition complex (ORC)	Heterohexameric complex composed of Orc1–Orc6 proteins. Binds to DNA and assembles Mcm2-7 complex onto chromatin together with Cdc6 and Cdt1.
Proliferating cell nuclear antigen (PCNA)	Trimeric protein with ring-shaped structure, encloses DNA preventing dissociation of DNA polymerase. Acts as a sliding clamp for polymerases δ and ε, thereby improving processivity of replicative polymerases.
Replication factor C (RFC)	Loads PCNA on primed templates and is involved in the switch between DNA polymerase a and the replicative polymerases δ and ε.
Replication fork barriers (RFBs)	Bound by RFB proteins in various locations throughout the genome. Are able to terminate or pause replication forks, stopping progression of the replisome.
Replication protein A (RPA)	Heterotrimeric single-stranded binding protein. Stabilizes single-stranded DNA at replication fork.
RNase H	Ribonuclease which digests RNA hybridized to DNA. Involved in Okazaki fragment processing.
Sld2	Functions in initiation of replication. Key substrate of CDK, phosphorylation promotes interaction with Dpb11. Required for initiation of replication.
Sld3	Functions in initiation of replication. Key substrate of CDK, phosphorylation promotes interaction with Dpb11. Required for initiation of replication.
Telomerase	A ribonucleoprotein that adds DNA sequence "TTAGGG" repeats to the 3' end of DNA strands in telomeres.
Topoisomerases	Regulate the overwinding or underwinding of DNA

== See also ==
- DNA replication
- Prokaryotic DNA replication
- Processivity
