= MCM5 =

Protein-coding gene in humans

Identifiers
- Aliases: MCM5, CDC46, P1-CDC46, minichromosome maintenance complex component 5, MGORS8
- External IDs: OMIM: 602696; MGI: 103197; GeneCards: MCM5
Enzyme activity
EC #	BRENDA	ExPASy	KEGG	MetaCyc
3.6.4.12	↗	↗	↗	↗

Gene location (Human)
Chr.	Chromosome 22 (human)
Band	22q12.3	Start	35,400,134 bp
Band	22q12.3	End	35,425,431 bp

Gene location (Mouse)
Chr.	Chromosome 8 (mouse)
Band	8|8 C1	Start	75,836,197 bp
Band	8|8 C1	End	75,855,067 bp
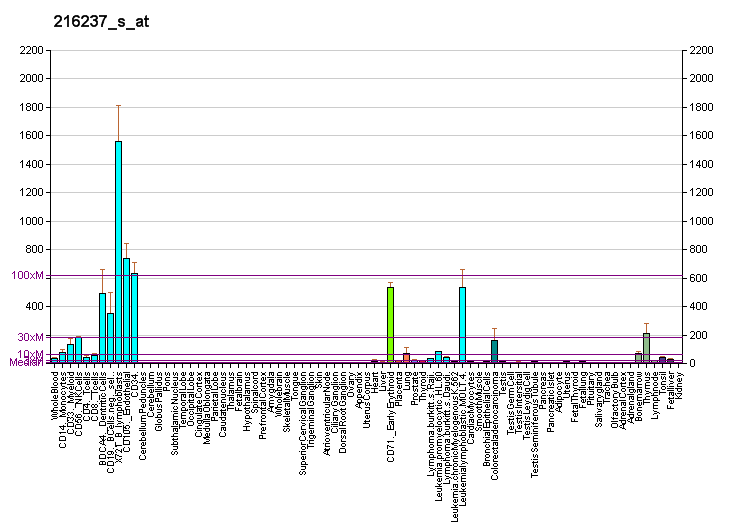

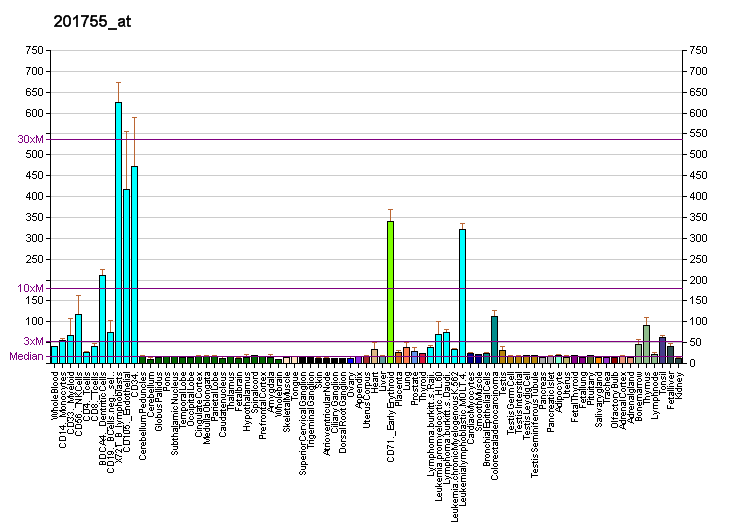
RNA expression pattern
Bgee	Human / Mouse (ortholog); Top expressed in: ventricular zone; ganglionic eminence; appendix; granulocyte; bone marrow cell; lymph node; spleen; monocyte; gonad; rectum / Top expressed in: internal carotid artery; external carotid artery; primitive streak; maxillary prominence; mandibular prominence; abdominal wall; vas deferens; Gonadal ridge; endocardial cushion; dermis; More reference expression data
BioGPS	More reference expression data
Gene ontology
Molecular function	nucleotide binding; DNA binding; DNA helicase activity; DNA replication origin binding; chromatin binding; protein binding; hydrolase activity; ATP binding; helicase activity; single-stranded DNA binding; single-stranded DNA helicase activity; 3'-5' DNA helicase activity
Cellular component	MCM complex; membrane; nucleus; nucleoplasm; cytoplasm; cytosol
Biological process	G1 phase; DNA replication; cell cycle; DNA duplex unwinding; DNA replication initiation; G1/S transition of mitotic cell cycle; double-strand break repair via break-induced replication; pre-replicative complex assembly involved in nuclear cell cycle DNA replication
Sources:Amigo / QuickGO
Orthologs
Databases	NCBI: entry; OMA: entry
Species	Human	Mouse
Entrez	4174	17218
Ensembl	ENSG00000100297	ENSMUSG00000005410
UniProt	P33992	P49718
RefSeq (mRNA)	NM_006739	NM_008566; NM_001302540
RefSeq (protein)	NP_006730	NP_001289469; NP_032592
Location (UCSC)	Chr 22: 35.4 – 35.43 Mb	Chr 8: 75.84 – 75.86 Mb
PubMed search
- Wikidata
View/Edit Human	View/Edit Mouse

DNA replication licensing factor MCM5 is a protein that in humans is encoded by the MCM5 gene.

== Function ==
The protein encoded by this gene is structurally very similar to the CDC46 protein from S. cerevisiae, a protein involved in the initiation of DNA replication. The encoded protein is a member of the MCM family of chromatin-binding proteins and can interact with at least two other members of this family. The encoded protein is upregulated in the transition from the G0 to G1/S phase of the cell cycle and may actively participate in cell cycle regulation.

== See also ==
- Mini Chromosome Maintenance

== Interactions ==
MCM5 has been shown to interact with:

- Cell division cycle 7-related protein kinase,
- MCM2,
- MCM3,
- MCM7,
- ORC2L,
- ORC6L, and
- STAT1.
