= CDC45-related protein =

Protein-coding gene in humans

CDC45
Available structures
PDB	Ortholog search: PDBe RCSB
PDB	List of PDB id codes 5DGO

Identifiers
- Aliases: CDC45, CDC45L, CDC45L2, PORC-PI-1, CDC45-related protein, cell division cycle 45, MGORS7
- External IDs: OMIM: 603465; MGI: 1338073; HomoloGene: 2616; GeneCards: CDC45; OMA:CDC45 - orthologs

Gene location (Human)
Chr.	Chromosome 22 (human)
Band	22q11.21	Start	19,479,457 bp
Band	22q11.21	End	19,520,612 bp

Gene location (Mouse)
Chr.	Chromosome 16 (mouse)
Band	16 A3|16 11.63 cM	Start	18,599,197 bp
Band	16 A3|16 11.63 cM	End	18,630,737 bp
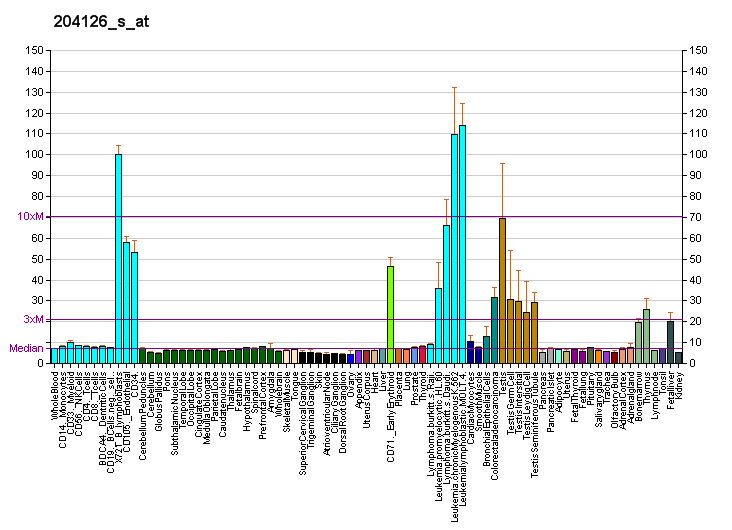
RNA expression pattern
Bgee	Human / Mouse (ortholog); Top expressed in: oocyte; secondary oocyte; right testis; left testis; gonad; ventricular zone; ganglionic eminence; testicle; mucosa of transverse colon; rectum / Top expressed in: zygote; tail of embryo; secondary oocyte; morula; embryo; granulocyte; spermatid; primitive streak; ventricular zone; spermatocyte; More reference expression data
BioGPS	More reference expression data
Gene ontology
Molecular function	chromatin binding; single-stranded DNA binding; protein binding; DNA replication origin binding; 3'-5' DNA helicase activity
Cellular component	cytoplasm; DNA replication preinitiation complex; centrosome; nuclear pre-replicative complex; replication fork protection complex; nucleoplasm; nucleus
Biological process	double-strand break repair via break-induced replication; regulation of transcription involved in G1/S transition of mitotic cell cycle; pre-replicative complex assembly involved in nuclear cell cycle DNA replication; DNA replication checkpoint signaling; positive regulation of G1/S transition of mitotic cell cycle; DNA replication; cell cycle; mitotic DNA replication preinitiation complex assembly; DNA duplex unwinding; DNA replication initiation; G1/S transition of mitotic cell cycle
Sources:Amigo / QuickGO
Orthologs
Species	Human	Mouse
Entrez	8318	12544
Ensembl	ENSG00000093009	ENSMUSG00000000028
UniProt	O75419	Q9Z1X9
RefSeq (mRNA)	NM_001178010; NM_001178011; NM_003504; NM_001369291	NM_001161623; NM_009862; NM_001358206
RefSeq (protein)	NP_001171481; NP_001171482; NP_003495; NP_001356220	NP_001155095; NP_033992; NP_001345135
Location (UCSC)	Chr 22: 19.48 – 19.52 Mb	Chr 16: 18.6 – 18.63 Mb
PubMed search
- Wikidata
View/Edit Human	View/Edit Mouse

CDC45 is a protein that in humans is encoded by the CDC45L gene.

== Function ==
The protein encoded by this gene was identified by its strong similarity with Saccharomyces cerevisiae Cdc45, an essential protein required to the initiation of DNA replication. Cdc45 is a member of the highly conserved multiprotein complex including Cdc6/Cdc18, the minichromosome maintenance proteins (MCMs) and DNA polymerase, which is important for early steps of DNA replication in eukaryotes. This protein has been shown to interact with MCM7 and DNA polymerase alpha. Studies of the similar gene in Xenopus suggested that this protein plays a pivotal role in the loading of DNA polymerase alpha onto chromatin. Multiple polyadenylation sites of this gene are reported.

== Interactions ==
CDC45-related protein has been shown to interact with:

- MCM3,
- MCM6,
- MCM7,
- ORC1L, and
- ORC6L.
