= GINS2 =

Protein-coding gene in the species Homo sapiens

Available structures
PDB	Ortholog search: PDBe RCSB
PDB	List of PDB id codes 2E9X, 2EHO, 2Q9Q

Identifiers
- Aliases: GINS2, HSPC037, PSF2, Pfs2, GINS complex subunit 2
- External IDs: OMIM: 610609; MGI: 1921019; HomoloGene: 41105; GeneCards: GINS2; OMA:GINS2 - orthologs

Gene location (Human)
Chr.	Chromosome 16 (human)
Band	16q24.1	Start	85,676,198 bp
Band	16q24.1	End	85,690,073 bp

Gene location (Mouse)
Chr.	Chromosome 8 (mouse)
Band	8|8 E1	Start	121,305,372 bp
Band	8|8 E1	End	121,316,043 bp
RNA expression pattern
Bgee	Human / Mouse (ortholog); Top expressed in: oocyte; secondary oocyte; ventricular zone; embryo; ganglionic eminence; sperm; bone marrow; mucosa of transverse colon; trabecular bone; testicle / Top expressed in: yolk sac; tail of embryo; embryo; embryo; genital tubercle; epiblast; blastocyst; ventricular zone; zygote; primary oocyte; More reference expression data
BioGPS	More reference expression data
Gene ontology
Molecular function	3'-5' DNA helicase activity; protein binding
Cellular component	GINS complex; replication fork protection complex; nucleus; nucleoplasm
Biological process	DNA replication; DNA strand elongation involved in DNA replication; double-strand break repair via break-induced replication; mitotic DNA replication initiation; DNA duplex unwinding
Sources:Amigo / QuickGO
Orthologs
Species	Human	Mouse
Entrez	51659	272551
Ensembl	ENSG00000131153	ENSMUSG00000031821
UniProt	Q9Y248	Q9D600
RefSeq (mRNA)	NM_016095	NM_178856
RefSeq (protein)	NP_057179	NP_849187
Location (UCSC)	Chr 16: 85.68 – 85.69 Mb	Chr 8: 121.31 – 121.32 Mb
PubMed search
- Wikidata
View/Edit Human	View/Edit Mouse

DNA replication complex GINS protein PSF2 is a protein that in humans is encoded by the GINS2 gene.

== Interactions ==
GINS2 has been shown to interact with CHEK2.
