= Cell division cycle 7-related protein kinase =

Protein found in humans

CDC7

Identifiers
- Aliases: CDC7, CDC7L1, HsHsk1, hucell division cycle 7
- External IDs: OMIM: 603311; MGI: 1309511; GeneCards: CDC7
Available structures
PDB	Ortholog search: PDBe RCSB
PDB	List of PDB id codes 4F99, 4F9A, 4F9B, 4F9C
Enzyme activity
EC #	BRENDA	ExPASy	KEGG	MetaCyc
2.7.11.1	↗	↗	↗	↗

Gene location (Human)
Chr.	Chromosome 1 (human)
Band	1p22.2-p22.1	Start	91,500,851 bp
Band	1p22.2-p22.1	End	91,525,764 bp

Gene location (Mouse)
Chr.	Chromosome 5 (mouse)
Band	5|5 E5	Start	107,112,188 bp
Band	5|5 E5	End	107,132,298 bp
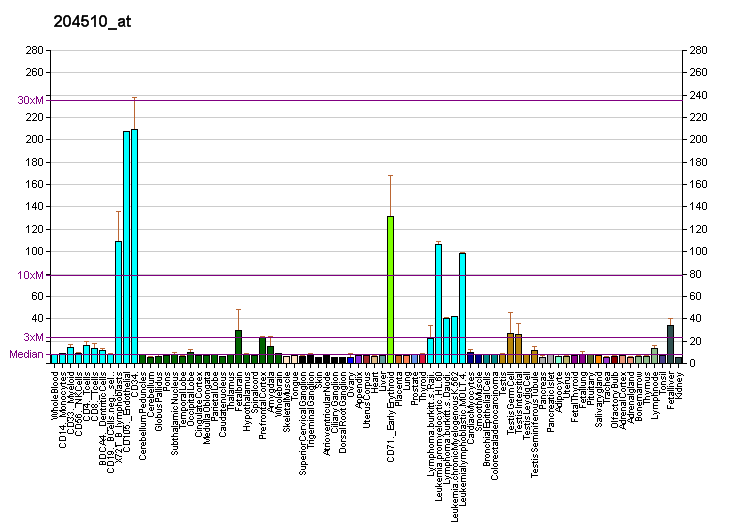
RNA expression pattern
Bgee	Human / Mouse (ortholog); Top expressed in: secondary oocyte; endothelial cell; gonad; ventricular zone; embryo; ganglionic eminence; buccal mucosa cell; testicle; cerebellar hemisphere; right hemisphere of cerebellum / Top expressed in: otic placode; saccule; otic vesicle; medullary collecting duct; primitive streak; Paneth cell; condyle; spermatocyte; vas deferens; fossa; More reference expression data
BioGPS	More reference expression data
Gene ontology
Molecular function	transferase activity; protein kinase activity; nucleotide binding; metal ion binding; kinase activity; protein serine/threonine kinase activity; protein binding; ATP binding
Cellular component	cytoplasm; nucleoplasm; intercellular bridge; nucleus; mitotic spindle
Biological process	cell cycle phase transition; phosphorylation; double-strand break repair via break-induced replication; positive regulation of nuclear cell cycle DNA replication; cell division; DNA replication; protein phosphorylation; DNA replication initiation; peptidyl-serine phosphorylation; positive regulation of cell population proliferation; phagocytosis; positive regulation of G2/M transition of mitotic cell cycle; cell cycle; regulation of cell shape; negative regulation of G0 to G1 transition; G1/S transition of mitotic cell cycle; peptidyl-threonine phosphorylation
Sources:Amigo / QuickGO
Orthologs
Databases	NCBI: entry; OMA: entry
Species	Human	Mouse
Entrez	8317	12545
Ensembl	ENSG00000097046	ENSMUSG00000029283
UniProt	O00311	Q9Z0H0
RefSeq (mRNA)	NM_001134419; NM_001134420; NM_003503	NM_001271566; NM_001271567; NM_001271568; NM_009863
RefSeq (protein)	NP_001127891; NP_001127892; NP_003494	NP_001258495; NP_001258496; NP_001258497; NP_033993
Location (UCSC)	Chr 1: 91.5 – 91.53 Mb	Chr 5: 107.11 – 107.13 Mb
PubMed search
- Wikidata
View/Edit Human	View/Edit Mouse

Cell division cycle 7-related protein kinase is an enzyme that in humans is encoded by the CDC7 gene. The Cdc7 kinase is involved in regulation of the cell cycle at the point of chromosomal DNA replication. The gene CDC7 appears to be conserved throughout eukaryotic evolution; this means that most eukaryotic cells have the Cdc7 kinase protein.

== Function ==
The product encoded by this gene is predominantly localized in the nucleus and is a cell division cycle protein with kinase activity. The protein is a serine-threonine kinase that is activated by another protein called either Dbf4 in the yeast Saccharomyces cerevisiae or ASK in mammals. The Cdc7/Dbf4 complex adds a phosphate group to the minichromosome maintenance (MCM) protein complex allowing for the initiation of DNA replication in mitosis (as explained in the Cdc7 and Replication section below). Although expression levels of the protein appear to be constant throughout the cell cycle, the protein kinase activity appears to increase during S phase. It has been suggested that the protein is essential for initiation of DNA replication and that it plays a role in regulating cell cycle progression. Overexpression of this gene product may be associated with neoplastic transformation for some tumors. Additional transcript sizes have been detected, suggesting the presence of alternative splicing.

== Cell cycle regulation ==
The gene, CDC7, is involved in the regulation of cell cycle because of the gene product Cdc7 kinase. The protein is expressed at constant levels throughout the cell cycle. The gene coding for the Dbf4 or ASK protein is regulated during the different phases of cell cycle. The concentration of Dbf4 at the G1/S transition of the cell cycle is higher than the concentration at the M/G1 transition. This tells us that Dbf4 is expressed around the time for replication; right after replication is over, the protein levels drop. Because the two proteins, Cdc7 and Dbf4, must form a complex before activating the MCM complex, the regulation of one protein is sufficient for both.

It has been shown that CDC7 is important for replication. There are several ways its expression can be altered that leads to problems. In mouse embryonic stem cells (ESCs), Cdc7 is needed for proliferation. Without the CDC7 gene DNA synthesis is stopped, and the ESCs do not grow. With the loss of function of Cdc7 in ESCs the S phase is stopped at the G2/M checkpoint. Recombinational repair (RR) is done at this point to try to fix the CDC7 gene so replication can occur. By copying and replacing the altered area with a very similar area on the sister homolog chromosome, the gene can be replicated as if nothing was ever wrong on the chromosome. However, when the cell enters this arrested state, levels of p53 may increase. These increased levels of p53 may initiate cell death.

== Replication ==
After chromatin undergoes changes in telophase of mitosis, the hexameric protein complex of MCM proteins 2-7 forms part of the pre-replication complex (pre-RC) by binding to the chromatin and other aiding proteins (Cdc6 and Cdt1). Mitosis occurs during M phase of the cell cycle and has a number of stages; telophase is the end stage of mitosis when the replication of chromosomes is complete, but separation has not occurred.

The Cdc7/Dbf4 kinase complex, along with another serine-threonine kinase, cyclin-dependent kinase (Cdk), phosphorylates the pre-RC which activates it at the G1/S transition. The Dbf4 tethers itself to part of the pre-RC, the origin recognition complex (ORC). Since Cdc7 is attached to the Dbf4 protein the entire complex is held in place during replication. This activation of MCM 2 leads to helicase activity of the MCM complex at the origin of replication. This is most likely due to the change in conformation allowing the remainder of replication machinery proteins to be loaded. DNA replication can begin after all the necessary proteins are in place.

== Interactions ==
CDC7 has been shown to interact with:

- DBF4,
- MCM5,
- MCM4,
- MCM7,
- ORC1L, and
- ORC6L.

== Ligands ==
Inhibitors

- XL-413
