= Gene amplification =

Increase in the number of copies of a gene

Gene amplification refers to a number of natural and artificial processes by which the number of copies of a gene is increased "without a proportional increase in other genes".

A piece of DNA or RNA that is the source and/or product of either natural or artificial amplification or replication events is called an amplicon.

== Natural gene amplification ==
=== Developmentally regulated amplification ===
In 1968, Donald D. Brown and Igor B. Dawid were studying amplified ribosomal DNA, the DNA encoding 28S and 18S ribosomal RNAs, and described “specific gene amplification” in oocytes. In this work in amphibian oocytes, extra ribosomal DNA copies were found to occur in the germinal vesicle; these are associated with extrachromosomal nucleoli. The amplified ribosomal DNA was found to be enriched relative to bulk nuclear DNA and relative to DNA homologous to 4S and 5S RNA. The authors found evidence for extra ribosomal DNA copies in oocytes of several amphibians and also in an echiuroid worm and a surf clam. This paper provided some of the first evidence of a reversible, cell-type-specific gene alteration during development.

=== Adaptive amplification under selection ===
Under natural selection or artificial selection, there are documented cases where increased gene copy number by gene amplification increases expression of a target or resistance gene; well known cases including herbicide resistance in plants, or drug or antimicrobial resistance in bacteria or yeast.

For example, in Saccharomyces cerevisiae, copper resistance is associated with increased copy number of CUP1, which encodes a metallothionein. The level of copper resistance is proportional to CUP1 copy number, and the locus can occur in tandemly repeated copies.

There are also many examples where bacteria increase resistance by amplifying genes encoding drug targets, efflux functions, or antibiotic-modifying enzymes. In the latter category, there are documented cases of resistance against the beta-lactam ampicillin in which bacterial strains adapted to high levels of the antibiotic via amplification of the gene encoding beta-lactamase enzyme AmpC.

In plants, there are numerous examples of gene amplification for herbicide tolerance, in response to the selective forces of herbicides such as glyphosate. In field conditions, after repeated agricultural treatments and over multiple years, a genomic amplification of EPSP synthase has been observed in glyphosate-resistant weeds such as Palmer amaranth, kochia, waterhemp, goosegrass, Italian ryegrass, and annual bluegrass. The enzymatic activity of the EPSP synthase enzyme activity is equally inhibited by glyphosate in both resistant and susceptible plants, but the relative copy number of the encoding gene is increased in the glyphosate-resistant plants by anywhere from 5-fold to >160-fold resulting in a significant increase in the enzyme targeted by glyphosate, and allowing the weeds to survive. EPSP synthase gene amplification is one of the main mechanisms of glyphosate resistance in weeds as a result of increased EPSP synthase copy number and expression.

=== Related genomic processes ===
At a genome level, the amount of DNA or the number of genes can also increase within an organism through gene duplication, a major mechanism through which new genetic material is generated during molecular evolution. Common sources of gene duplications that lead to gene amplification include ectopic recombination, retrotransposition events, and replication slippage. Broader-scale evolutionary or chromosomal events may involve aneuploidy or polyploidy, are not typically considered as gene amplification that leads to increased copies of a specific gene or genomic region.

== Laboratory nucleic-acid amplification ==
In research or diagnosis DNA amplification can be conducted through methods such as:

- Polymerase chain reaction, an easy, cheap, and reliable way to repeatedly replicate a focused segment of DNA by polymerizing nucleotides, a concept which is applicable to numerous fields in modern biology and related sciences.
- Ligase chain reaction, a method that amplifies the nucleic acid used as the probe. For each of the two DNA strands, two partial probes are ligated to form the actual one; thus, LCR uses two enzymes: a DNA polymerase (used for initial template amplification and then inactivated) and a thermostable DNA ligase.
- Transcription-mediated amplification, an isothermal, single-tube nucleic acid amplification system utilizing two enzymes, RNA polymerase and reverse transcriptase, to rapidly amplify the target RNA/DNA, enabling the simultaneous detection of multiple pathogenic organisms in a single tube.
- Rolling circle amplification (RCA) is an isothermal amplification method adapted from the Rolling circle replication. By this method a continuous single stranded DNA is created by amplification of a circular DNA.
