= Igor B. Dawid =

American biochemist and developmental biologist (1935–2024)

- Born: February 26, 1935
- Died: February 13, 2024 (aged 88)
- Education: University of Vienna
- Known for: Maternal inheritance of mitochondrial DNA; Gene amplification in oocytes Embryonic patterning genes Xenopus and zebrafish developmental genetics
- Awards: Society for Developmental Biology Lifetime Achievement Award (2008); Member, National Academy of Sciences (1981); Fellow, American Academy of Arts and Sciences (1989)
- Scientific career
- Fields: Developmental biology Molecular biology
- Workplaces: Carnegie Institution of Washington; National Cancer Institute; Eunice Kennedy Shriver National Institute of Child Health and Human Development

Igor Bert Dawid (February 26, 1935 – February 13, 2024) was a developmental biologist who specialized in molecular mechanisms of embryogenesis. His work provided some of the first molecular evidence for the maternal inheritance of mitochondrial DNA, although the focus of his work was intercellular communication and transcriptional regulation in the context of the control of cell differentiation and pattern formation in the vertebrate embryo. Dawid was elected to the National Academy of Sciences in 1981 and a fellow of the American Academy of Arts and Sciences (elected in 1989).

== Early life and education ==
Dawid was born February 26, 1935 in Chernivtsi (now Ukraine). His childhood was shaped by his experiences in World War II, as he was a survivor of the Holocaust; his father was Jewish, and he and his family avoided capture by the Nazis on several occasions.

Despite limited formal schooling during childhood, Dawid was admitted to the University of Vienna, where he studied chemistry, ultimately receiving his PhD in chemistry and biochemistry from University of Vienna in 1960, focused on sphingomyelin structure. He continued his studies of biochemistry in postdoctoral training at the Massachusetts Institute of Technology.

== Career ==
In 1963 Dawid joined the Department of Embryology at the Carnegie Institution of Washington. One of his colleagues and collaborators there was Don Brown; together they used and advanced Xenopus laevis as a model system. In early work in this job, Dawid identified the mitochondrial origin of cytoplasmic DNA in frog eggs, demonstrating the maternal inheritance of mitochondrial DNA.

Dawid was recruited to the National Cancer Institute in 1978, and in 1982 he joined the National Institute of Child Health and Human Development. He was subsequently promoted to both head of the Section on Developmental Biology (1982–2016) and Chief of the Laboratory of Molecular Genetics (1982–2010). He continued to perform research until retirement in 2016, becoming Scientist Emeritus after retirement.

Dawid mentored over 100 scientists during his career, and his trainees work or worked in positions throughout academia, industry, and government.

== Research and major contributions ==
Dawid largely focused on Xenopus developmental biology but also later worked on zebrafish; he also contributed to early gene isolation studies developed prior to the emergence of recombinant DNA technologies.

The work of Dawid and Brown was to important to molecular biology, because it demonstrated that during the production of oocytes in Xenopus, extrachromosomal nucleoli are produced that contain copies of ribosomal RNA (rRNA) genes, a phenomenon known as gene amplification (a discovery subsequently verified in Tetrahymena by Joseph G. Gall).

Dawid's work demonstrated that extra DNA in amphibian eggs is mitochondrial DNA of maternal origin. This provided early proof of existence and inheritance of mitochondrial DNA.

Dawid's lab also developed molecular methods to study gene expression. For example, working with Dawid, Thomas J. Sargent developed differential (subtracted) cDNA library techniques to analyze RNA during Xenopus development. The approach of 'subtracting' cDNA libraries was thereafter used to identify low- and moderate-abundance RNAs.

In the early 1990s, Dawid was among the first NIH scientists to adopt zebrafish as a model organism, conducting large-scale gene expression screens and using whole mount in situ hybridization to map spatiotemporal gene expression during early development. Dawid led development of radiation hybrid genome mapping resources to identify mutations in zebrafish genes.

== Honors and awards ==
Dawid received numerous awards for his work, including:

- Society for Developmental Biology Lifetime Achievement Award (2008)
- Member (1981), National Academy of Sciences
- Fellow, American Academy of Arts and Sciences (1989)
- Fellow, American Association for the Advancement of Science
- Fellow (1992), American Academy of Microbiology
- Corresponding member, Austrian Academy of Science
- Distinguished Service Award, U.S. Department of Health and Human Services

== Editorial and professional service ==
- Editor-in-Chief, Developmental Biology (1975–1980)
- Editor-in-Chief, Proceedings of the National Academy of Sciences (PNAS)
- Chair of the Board, PNAS

== Personal life ==
Dawid was married to Keiko Ozato, an immunologist at NICHD.
