= LCR =

LCR may refer to:

== Businesses and organizations ==
=== Government and political ===
- Log Cabin Republicans, an LGBT group that supports the US Republican Party
- London and Continental Railways, a UK-government-owned property developer
- Revolutionary Communist League (France) (French: Ligue Communiste Révolutionnaire), a former political party in France
- Revolutionary Communist League (Belgium) (French: Ligue Communiste Révolutionnaire), a political party in Belgium
- Liverpool City Region Combined Authority, a local authority in the northwest of England

=== Motor racing ===
- Louis Christen Racing, a manufacturer of sidecar road racing chasses
- LCR Team, a motorcycle team currently competing in MotoGP

=== Religious ===
- LifeWay Christian Resources, a Christian publisher in Nashville, TN, US
- Lutheran Churches of the Reformation

== Military and weapons ==
- Landing Craft Rubber, an inflatable rubber boat for troops
  - Landing Craft Rubber Large (LCR(L)), in WWII
- Ruger LCR, a 2009 revolver

== Places ==
- Lake County Railroad, Oregon, United States
- Laos–China Railway or Boten–Vientiane railway, Lao
- Liverpool City Region, northwest England

== Science and technology ==
=== Electrical engineering ===
- LCR circuit, an inductor, capacitor and resistor electrical circuit
- LCR meter, for measuring inductance, capacitance and resistance
- Left/Center/Right, a speaker designation type used in surround sound

=== Molecular biology ===
- Leucocyanidin reductase, an enzyme in the leucocyanidin biosynthesis pathway
- Ligase chain reaction, a method for DNA amplification similar to the polymerase chain reaction
- Locus control region, in epigenetics
- Low copy repeats, in molecular genetics

=== Telecommunications ===
- Line Concentration Ratio; see Number Five Crossbar Switching System
- Low Chip Rate, one of the two transmission modes of UMTS-TDD 3G standard
- Least-cost routing, outbound traffic triaging based on cost

== Other uses ==
- Lead and Copper Rule, a regulation issued under the US Safe Drinking Water Act
- Liquidity Coverage Ratio, a global minimum liquidity standard that is part of Basel III
- Local content requirements, industrial policy to protect local production
- Loughborough Campus Radio
