= Donald D. Brown =

American university teacher (1931–2023)

- Born: December 30, 1931; Cincinnati, Ohio
- Died: May 31, 2023 (aged 91); Woodbrook, Baltimore County, Maryland
- Education: University of Chicago Medical School
- Awards: NAS Award in Molecular Biology (1973); Louisa Gross Horwitz Prize (1985); E.B. Wilson Medal (1996); Developmental Biology-SDB Lifetime Achievement Award (2009)
- Scientific career
- Fields: Embryology, biology
- Workplaces: Carnegie Institution for Science; Johns Hopkins University

Donald David Brown (December 30, 1931 – May 31, 2023) was an American biologist and one of the founders of molecular embryology.

== Early life ==
Brown was born in Cincinnati, Ohio, to Dr. Albert Brown, an ophthalmologist, and Louise Rauh.

=== Education ===
Brown attended Dartmouth College. In 1956, he received an MD and MS from University of Chicago Medical School, writing his master's thesis on the mechanism of viral invasion.

== Career ==
After a year working as an intern at Charity Hospital in New Orleans, Brown began a two year fellowship with the National Institutes of Health the direction of neuroscientist Seymour Kety. In 1959, he conducted postdoctoral studies with Jacques Monod at the Pasteur Institute in Paris, France.

Brown joined the Carnegie Institution in Baltimore, Maryland in 1961. He initially joined the Department of Embryology as a staff scientist. In 1976, he became director of the department. Beginning in 1969, he was an adjunct professor of biology at Johns Hopkins. He was a member of the American Academy of Arts and Sciences, the National Academy of Sciences, and the American Philosophical Society.

Brown retired from the Carnegie Institution with emeritus status in 2005.

== Discoveries ==
Brown and John Gurdon found that certain frog mutants lacked nucleoli and thus did not produce ribosomal RNAs (rRNAs), indicating that nucleoli were the site of rRNA production. Later, Brown and Igor Dawid investigated why frog oocytes contained many more nucleoli than did somatic cells. They showed that the number of rDNA genes was amplified during oogenesis to support ribosome production needed for each oocyte (this discovery was independently made by Joseph Gall). After Max Birnstiel managed to isolate rDNA genes, Brown was the first who purified the genes encoding the smaller 5S rRNA genes and found a way to transcribe them in vitro. In fact, 5S rRNA genes were the first eukaryotic genes to be cloned. Brown and Robert Roeder found later that transcription of these genes was regulated by a transcription factor (TFIIIA) that binds within the gene.

== Awards ==
- NAS Award in Molecular Biology (1973)
- Louisa Gross Horwitz Prize (Columbia University) (1985)
- E.B. Wilson Medal (1996)
- Lifetime Achievement Award (2009) (Developmental Biology-SDB)
