= Goosegrass =

Goosegrass (sometimes goose grass) is a common name for several grasses, sedges, and annual herbs. The origin of the name is due either to a plant's use as food for geese or plant parts that look like the foot of a goose.

Goosegrass may refer to:

- Acrachne, genus of grass
- Carex eleusinoides, goosegrass sedge
- Carex lenticularis, goosegrass sedge
- Eleusine, genus of grass
- Eleusine indica, Indian goosegrass, also called wiregrass
- Galium aparine, also referred to as "cleavers"
- Galium murale, small goosegrass
- Puccinellia fasciculata, saltmarsh goosegrass
Plants named goosegrass
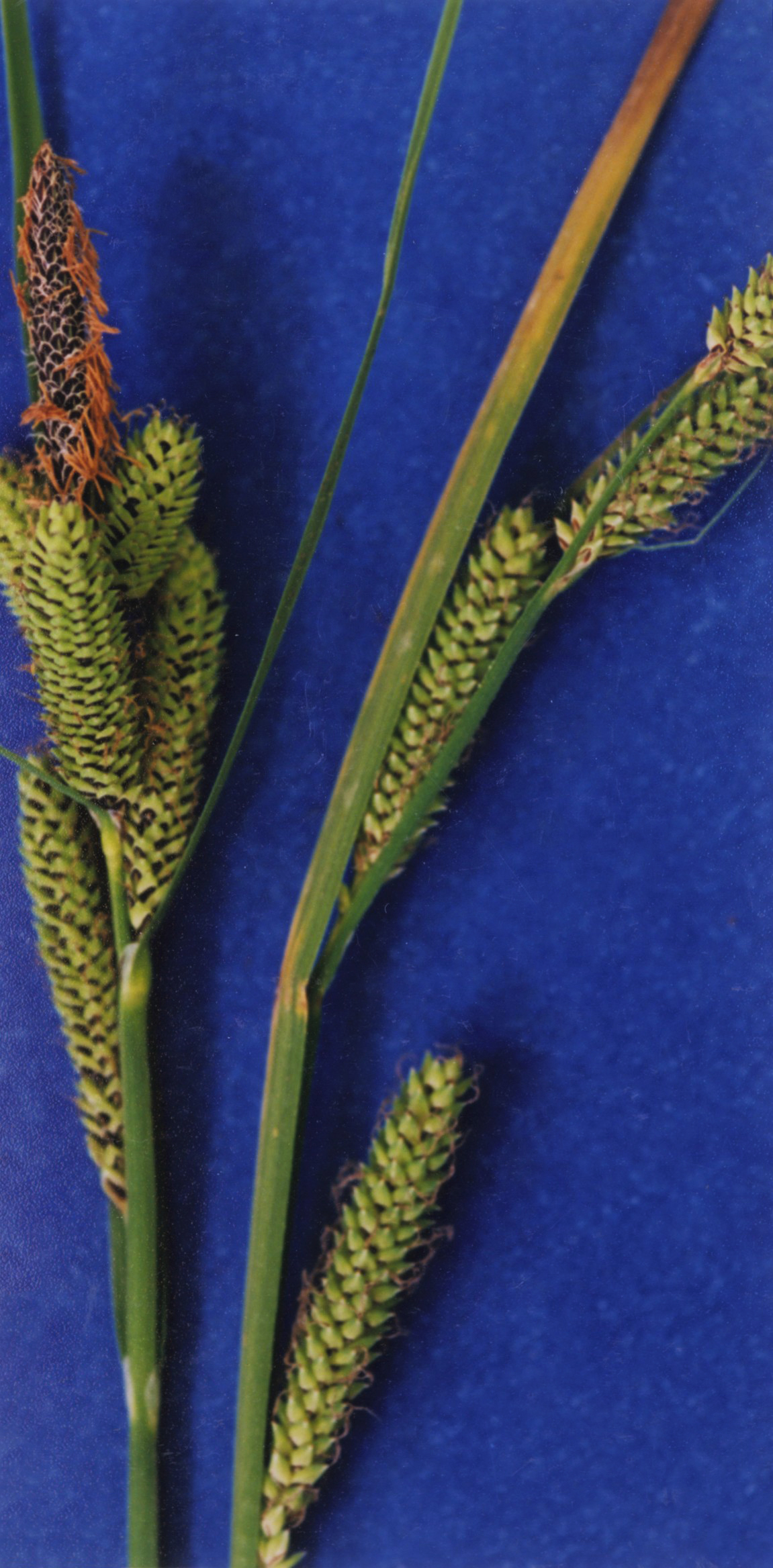
Carex lenticularis

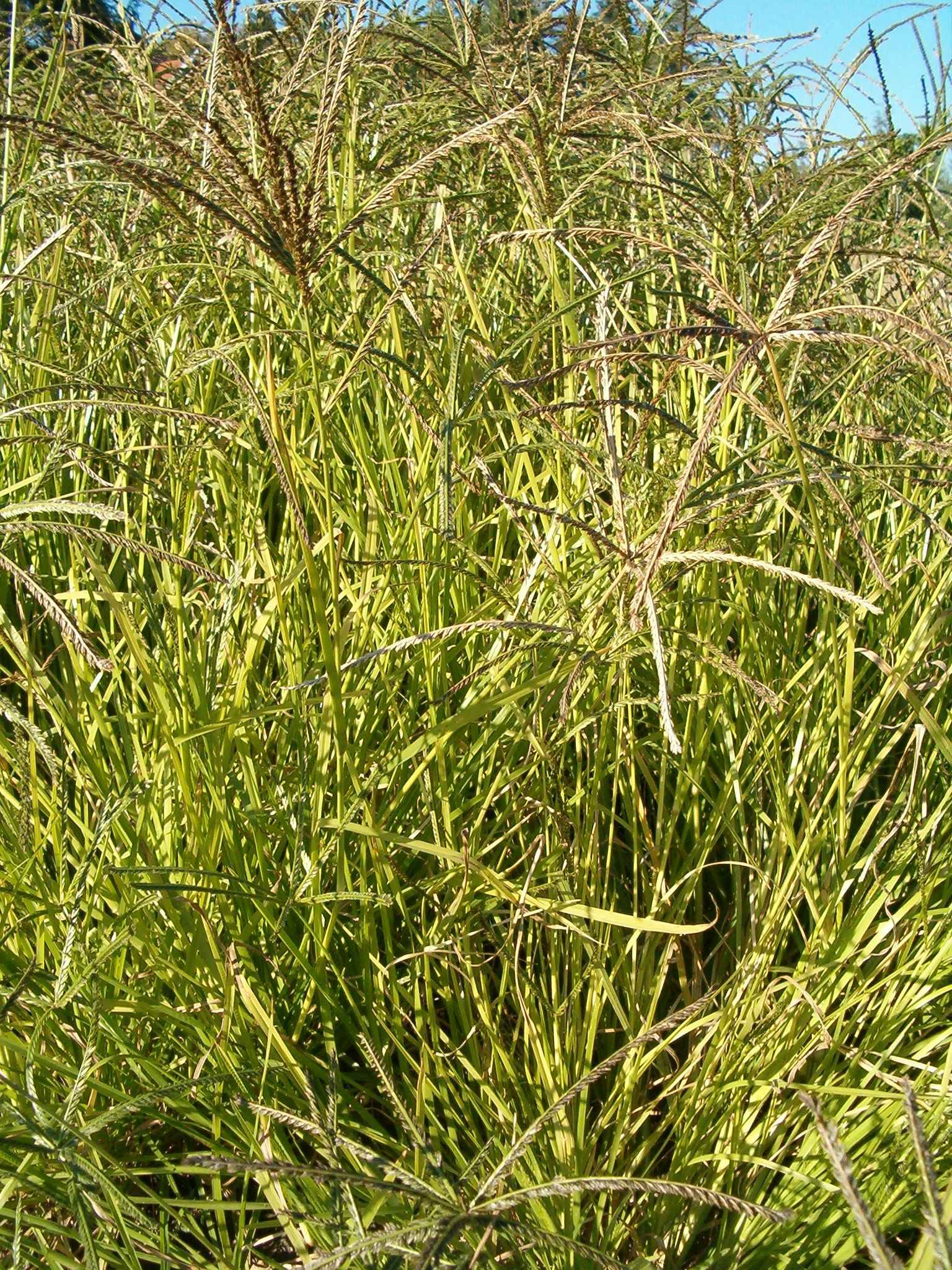
Eleusine indica

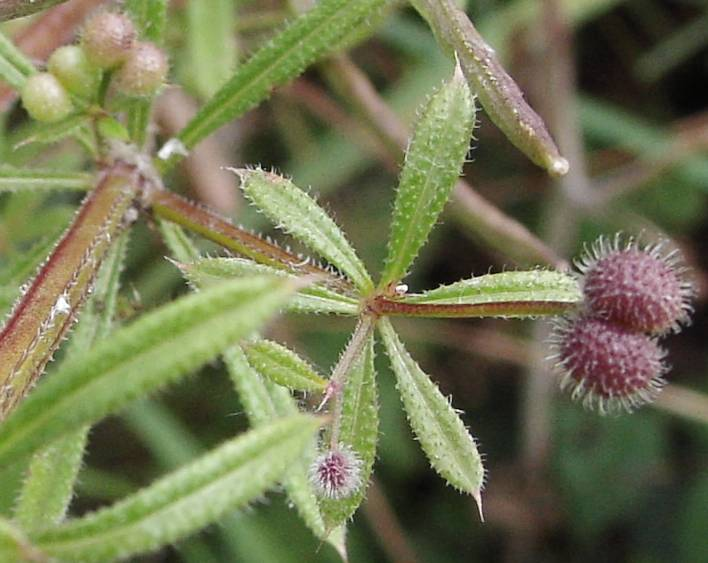
Galium aparine close-up
