= SeqA protein =

SeqA, C-terminal domain
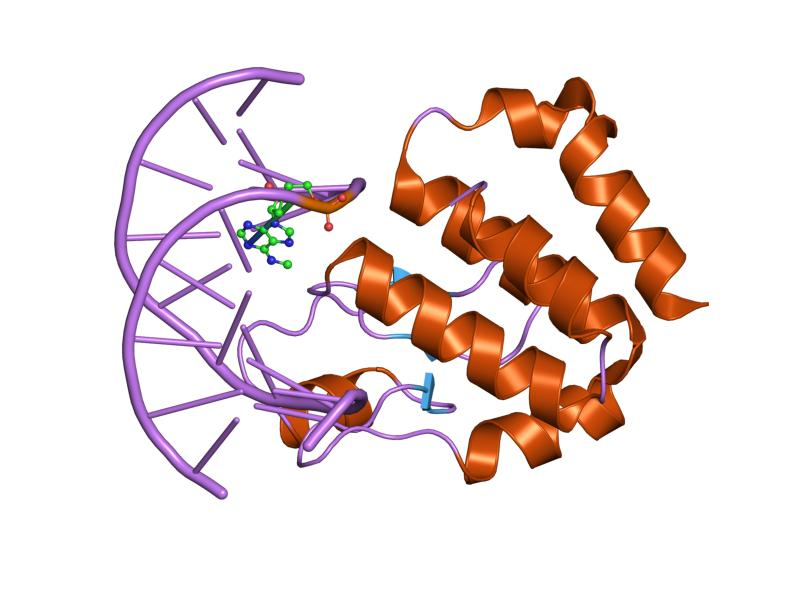
- Crystal structure of the E.coli SeqA protein complexed with n6-methyladenine- guanine mismatch DNA

Identifiers
- Symbol: SeqA
- Pfam: PF03925
- InterPro: IPR005621
- SCOP2: 1lrr / SCOPe / SUPFAM
Available protein structures:
- PDB: IPR005621 PF03925 (ECOD; PDBsum)
- AlphaFold: IPR005621; PF03925

In molecular biology the SeqA protein is found in bacteria and archaea. The function of this protein is highly important in DNA replication. The protein negatively regulates the initiation of DNA replication at the origin of replication, in Escherichia coli, OriC. Additionally the protein plays a further role in sequestration. The importance of this protein is vital, without its help in DNA replication, cell division and other crucial processes could not occur. This protein domain is thought to be part of a much larger protein complex which includes other proteins such as SeqB.

== Function ==
DNA replication is an energy consuming process and hence in bacteria the process only occurs at a specific checkpoint in the cell cycle. The binding of SeqA protein to hemimethylated GATC sequences is important in the negative modulation of chromosomal initiation at oriC, and in the formation of SeqA foci necessary for Escherichia coli chromosome segregation.

SeqA tetramers are able to aggregate or multimerize in a reversible, concentration-dependent manner. Apart from its function in the control of DNA replication, SeqA may also be a specific transcription factor.

Additionally, SeqA is also thought to have a role in chromosome organisation and gene regulation.

== Localisation ==
Most of the SeqA in the cell is found bound to new DNA, at the replication fork.

== Structure ==
=== N terminal domain ===
The N-terminal domain folds into two alpha-helices and one beta-strand. This protein domain is vital in assisting multimerisation.

=== C terminal domain ===
The C-terminal protein domain has an important role in binding to DNA. It binds to fully methylated and hemimethylated GATC sequences at oriC. The structure of the C-terminal domain consists of seven alpha-helices and a three-stranded beta-sheet.
