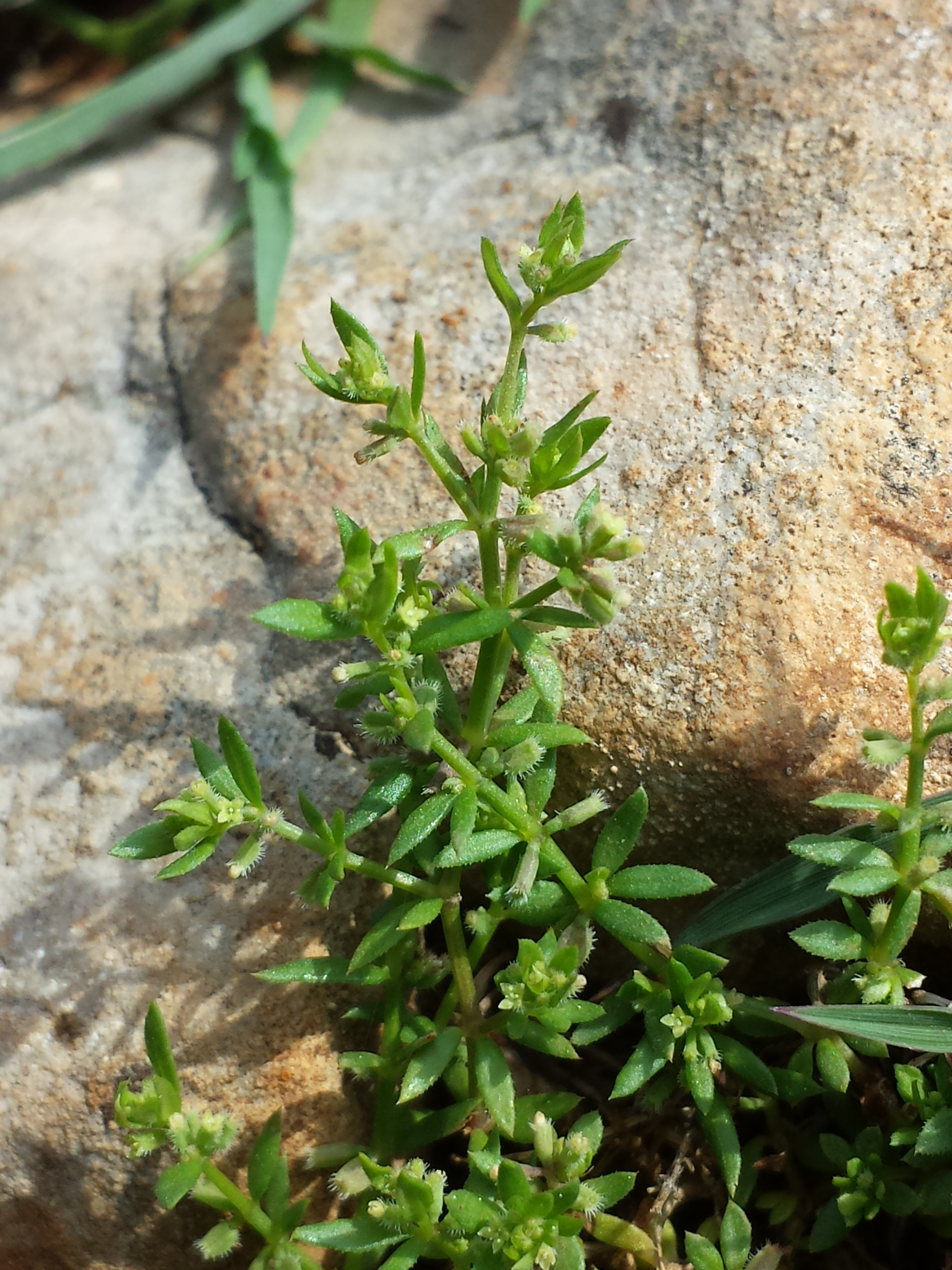

Scientific classification
- Kingdom: Plantae
- Clade: Tracheophytes
- Clade: Angiosperms
- Clade: Eudicots
- Clade: Asterids
- Order: Gentianales
- Family: Rubiaceae
- Genus: Galium
- Species: G. murale

Binomial name
- Galium murale (L.) All.

= Galium murale =

Species of plant

Galium murale is a species of flowering plant in the coffee family known by the common names small goosegrass, yellow wall bedstraw and tiny bedstraw. It is native to the Mediterranean Basin of southern Europe and northern Africa, and the Middle East from Turkey and the Caucasus east to Iran and south to Saudi Arabia and Somalia. It is also considered native to the Canary Islands, Madeira and the Azores. It is naturalised in Australia, New Zealand, Argentina, Chile and California.

Galium murale is an annual herb producing upright stems just a few centimeters long lined with whorls of 4 to 6 oval-shaped leaves not more than about 3 millimeters long each. Flowers appear singly or in pairs in the leaf axils. Each is about a millimeter wide and greenish to greenish-yellow. The fruit is a tiny nutlet coated in hooked hairs.

== Gallery ==
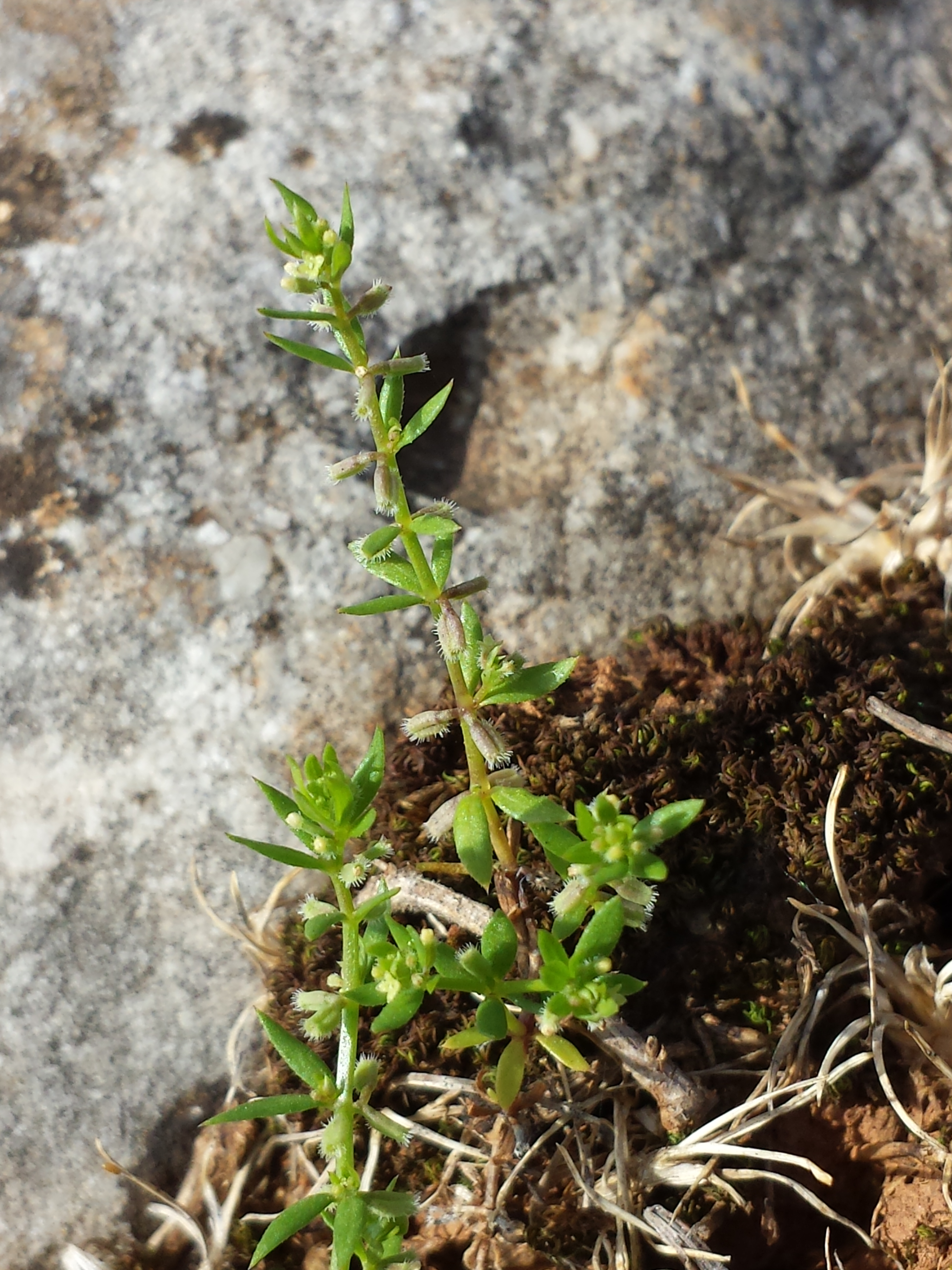
Habit

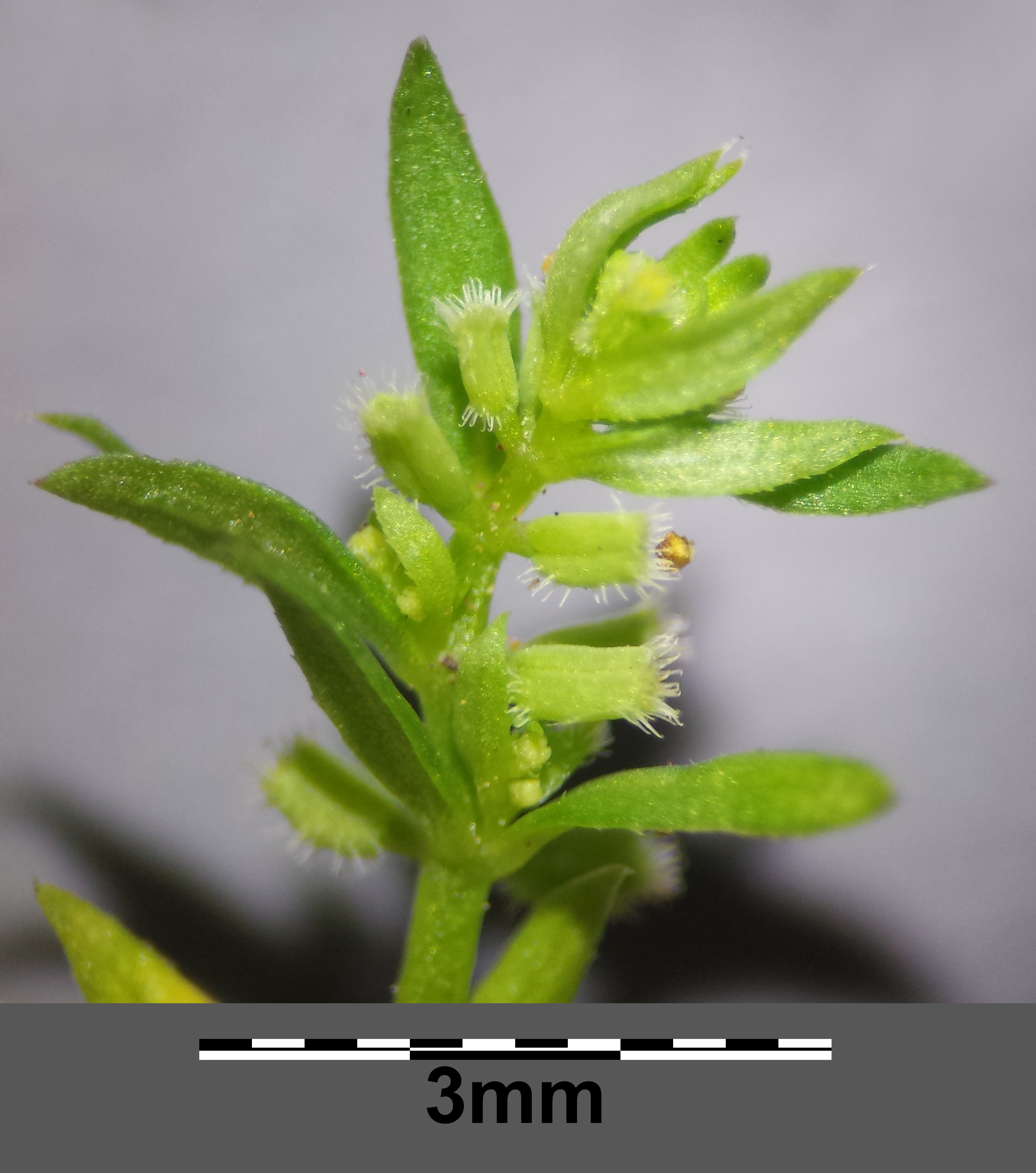
Infructescence (apical)

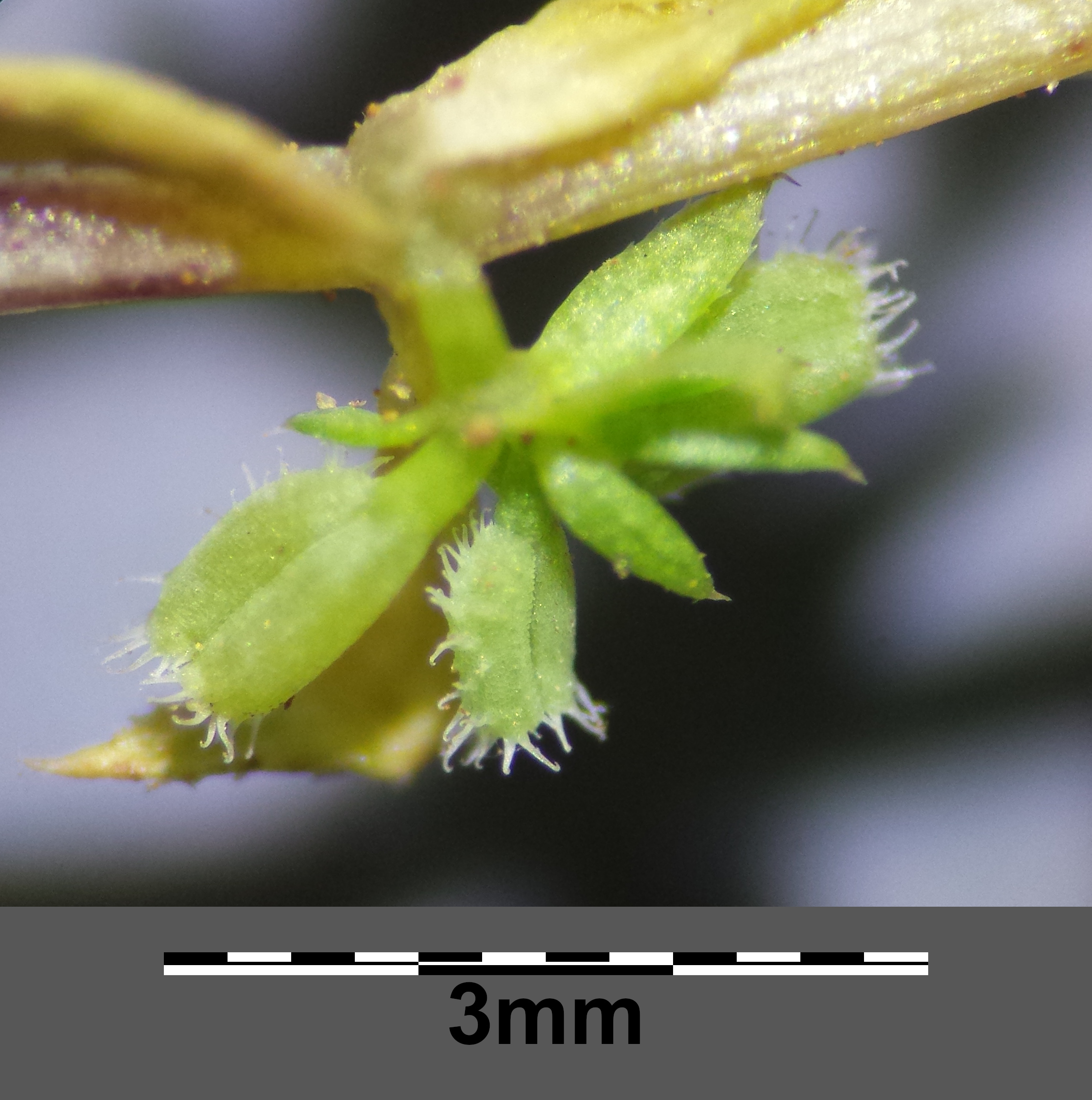
Infructescence (lateral)

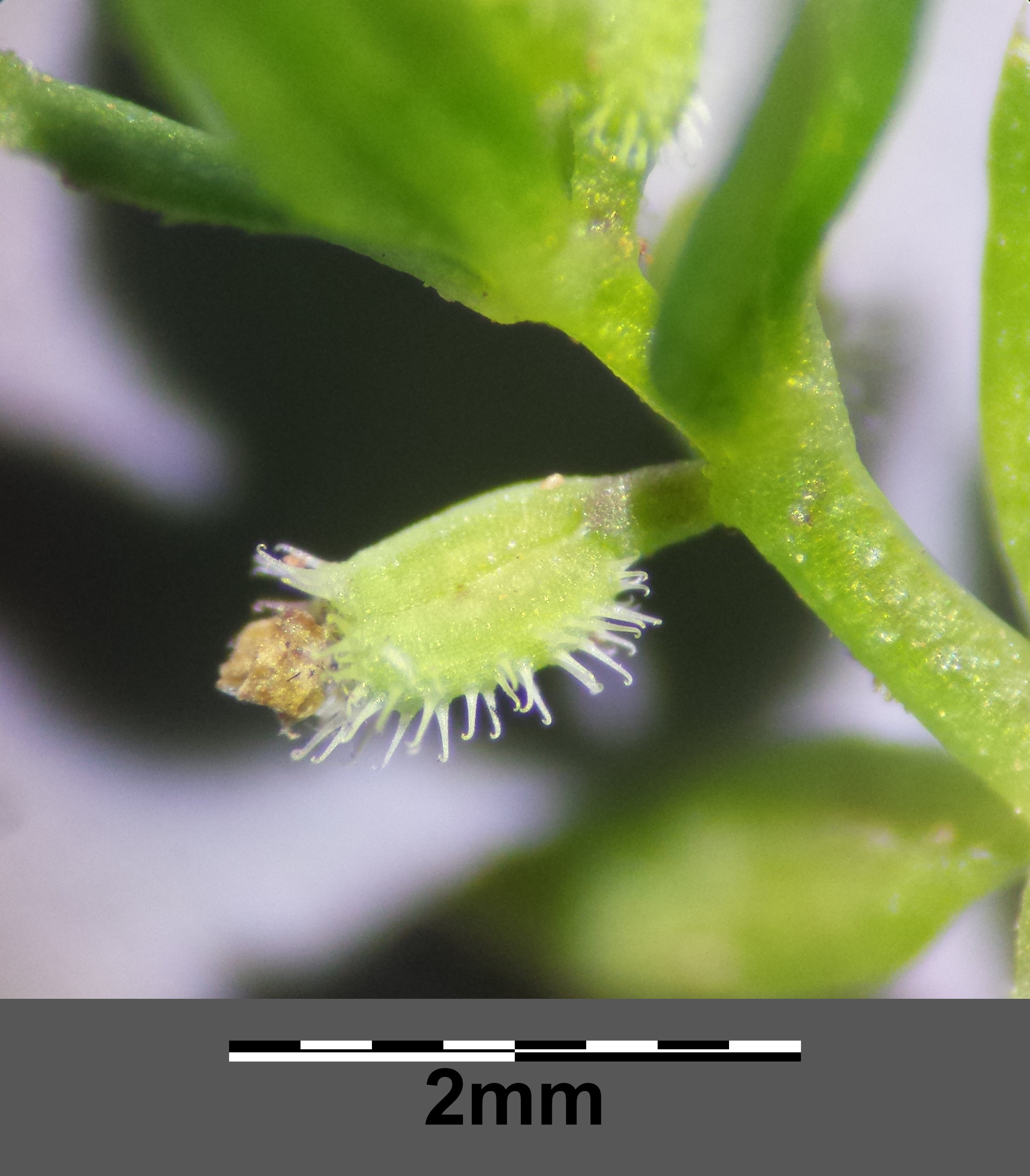
Fruit
