= Keiko Ozato =

Japanese American geneticist

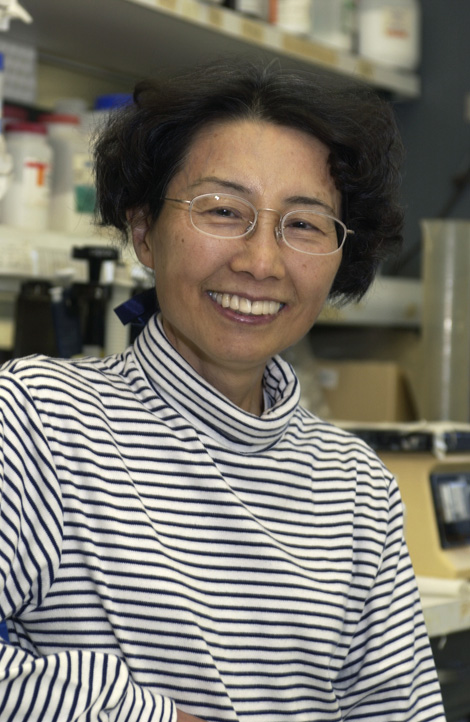
- Education: Kyoto University
- Scientific career
- Fields: Transcriptional gene regulation in innate immunity
- Workplaces: National Institute of Child Health and Human Development, NIH

Keiko Ozato is a Japanese American geneticist whose research has focused on gene regulation in the developing immune system; She is best known for her contributions to immunogenetics and epigenetics in isolating the IRF8 transcription factor that aids humans in fighting off disease and for identifying the BRD4 protein that regulates cellular and viral genes that can invoke epigenetic memory. She is Senior Investigator at the Section on Molecular Genetics of Immunity at the Eunice Kennedy Shriver National Institute of Child Health and Human Development (NICHD) at the National Institutes of Health in Bethesda, Maryland and a professor at the University of Maryland, College Park.

== Personal life ==
Ozato was born in Japan near the beginning of World War II. After the war, the entire Japanese culture was destroyed and left the country in shambles. Along with extreme poverty, Ozato's father suffered from tuberculosis which ultimately fueled her interest in immunology. She has also spoken of the support her mother, "a traditional Japanese housewife with no scientific education", that gave her choice of career. Ozato is married and has said that her husband is a valued scientific ally.

== Education and career ==
Ozato received her Ph.D. in Developmental Biology from Kyoto University in Japan in 1973 and then pursued postdoctoral training in developmental immunology at the Carnegie Institution for Science in Washington from 1973 to 1975. She was also a research associate at the Johns Hopkins University School of Medicine from 1975 to 1978 and a visiting associate at the National Cancer Institute from 1978 to 1981.

Ozato joined the National Institute of Child Health and Human Development in 1981 to launch an independent research group in molecular immunology and received tenure in 1987. In 1990 her laboratory isolated and reported IRF8 (Interferon regulatory factor 8), a transcription factor critical for host resistance against pathogens in macrophages and dendritic cells; she and her research group demonstrated its centrality to the induction of proinflammatory cytokines and autophagy regulation in these cells. IRF8 also happens to be crucial in the fighting of tuberculosis in the human immune system.

In 2014 Ozato also identified the BRD4 protein that binds to acetylated histones, proving that it recruits the elongation factor P-TEFb (CyclinT/CDk9 complex) and regulates many cellular and viral genes. She also discovered that BRD4 remains on chromosomes during mitosis and through that process invokes epigenetic memory. This was a key discovery in understanding the mechanisms in which epigenetic memory occurs. These advancements in the understanding of BRD4 proteins are allowing for advancements in the treatment of blood cancers and inflammatory diseases.

She is also a professor at the University of Maryland, College Park, as well as teaching several immunology courses in the NIH graduate program. She has served as President of the International Society of Interferon and Cytokine Research, and is on the editorial board of Molecular and Cell Biology, the Journal of Biological Chemistry, the Journal of Interferon and Cytokine Research, and Immunogenetics.

== Honors ==
Ozato was awarded the Milstein Award from the International Cytokine and Interferon Society in 2004. In 2012, she received the Order of the Sacred Treasure, Third Class, from the Government of Japan for promoting cooperation and exchange between Japan and the United States in the areas of science and technology.
