= Transcription factor III A =

Protein-coding gene in the species Homo sapiens

GTF3A

Identifiers
- Aliases: GTF3A, AP2, TFIIIA, general transcription factor IIIA
- External IDs: OMIM: 600860; MGI: 1913846; GeneCards: GTF3A

Gene location (Human)
Chr.	Chromosome 13 (human)
Band	13q12.2	Start	27,424,619 bp
Band	13q12.2	End	27,435,823 bp

Gene location (Mouse)
Chr.	Chromosome 5 (mouse)
Band	5|5 G3	Start	146,885,467 bp
Band	5|5 G3	End	146,892,424 bp
RNA expression pattern
Bgee	Human / Mouse (ortholog); Top expressed in: parotid gland; glutes; right ventricle; middle temporal gyrus; apex of heart; biceps brachii; thoracic diaphragm; palpebral conjunctiva; body of tongue; Skeletal muscle tissue of biceps brachii / Top expressed in: otic placode; saccule; otic vesicle; abdominal wall; embryo; tail of embryo; epiblast; primitive streak; neural tube; renal corpuscle; More reference expression data
BioGPS	n/a
Gene ontology
Molecular function	nucleic acid binding; DNA binding; metal ion binding; RNA binding; 5S rRNA binding; DNA-binding transcription factor activity, RNA polymerase II-specific
Cellular component	nucleus; nucleoplasm
Biological process	rRNA transcription; regulation of transcription, DNA-templated; transcription, DNA-templated; transcription by RNA polymerase III; ribosomal large subunit biogenesis; ribosome biogenesis; regulation of transcription by RNA polymerase II
Sources:Amigo / QuickGO
Orthologs
Databases	NCBI: entry; OMA: entry
Species	Human	Mouse
Entrez	2971	66596
Ensembl	ENSG00000122034	ENSMUSG00000016503
UniProt	Q92664	Q8VHT7
RefSeq (mRNA)	NM_002097	NM_025652
RefSeq (protein)	NP_002088	NP_079928
Location (UCSC)	Chr 13: 27.42 – 27.44 Mb	Chr 5: 146.89 – 146.89 Mb
PubMed search
- Wikidata
View/Edit Human	View/Edit Mouse

Transcription factor IIIA is a protein that in humans is encoded by the GTF3A gene.

It was first purified and identified as the first mammalian gene-specific activator by Robert G. Roeder in 1980, and later characterized by Wolffe and Brown in 1988.

The TFIIIA in Xenopus was the first zinc finger protein discovered.
