= Transcription-mediated amplification =

Transcription-mediated amplification (TMA) is an isothermal (performed at constant temperature), single-tube nucleic acid amplification system utilizing two enzymes, RNA polymerase and reverse transcriptase.

"Amplification" means creating many more copies of a strand of nucleic acid than was present at first, in order to readily detect it or test it. Rapidly amplifying the target RNA/DNA allows a lab to simultaneously detect multiple pathogenic organisms in a single tube. TMA technology allows a clinical laboratory to perform nucleic acid test (NAT) assays for blood screening with fewer steps, less processing time, and faster results. It is used in molecular biology, forensics, and medicine for the rapid identification and diagnosis of pathogenic organisms. In contrast to similar techniques such as polymerase chain reaction and ligase chain reaction, this method involves RNA transcription (via RNA polymerase) and DNA synthesis (via reverse transcriptase) to produce an RNA amplicon (the source or product of amplification) from a target nucleic acid. This technique can be used to target both RNA and DNA.

Transcription-mediated amplification has several advantages compared to other amplification methods including:

- TMA is isothermal, meaning it is performed at constant temperature. As such, a water bath or heat block can be used instead of a thermal cycler.
- TMA produces RNA amplicon rather than DNA amplicon. Since RNA is more labile in a laboratory environment, this reduces the possibility of carry-over contamination.
- TMA produces 100–1000 copies per cycle (PCR and LCR exponentially doubles each cycle). This results in a 10 billion fold increase of DNA (or RNA) copies within about 15–30 minutes.

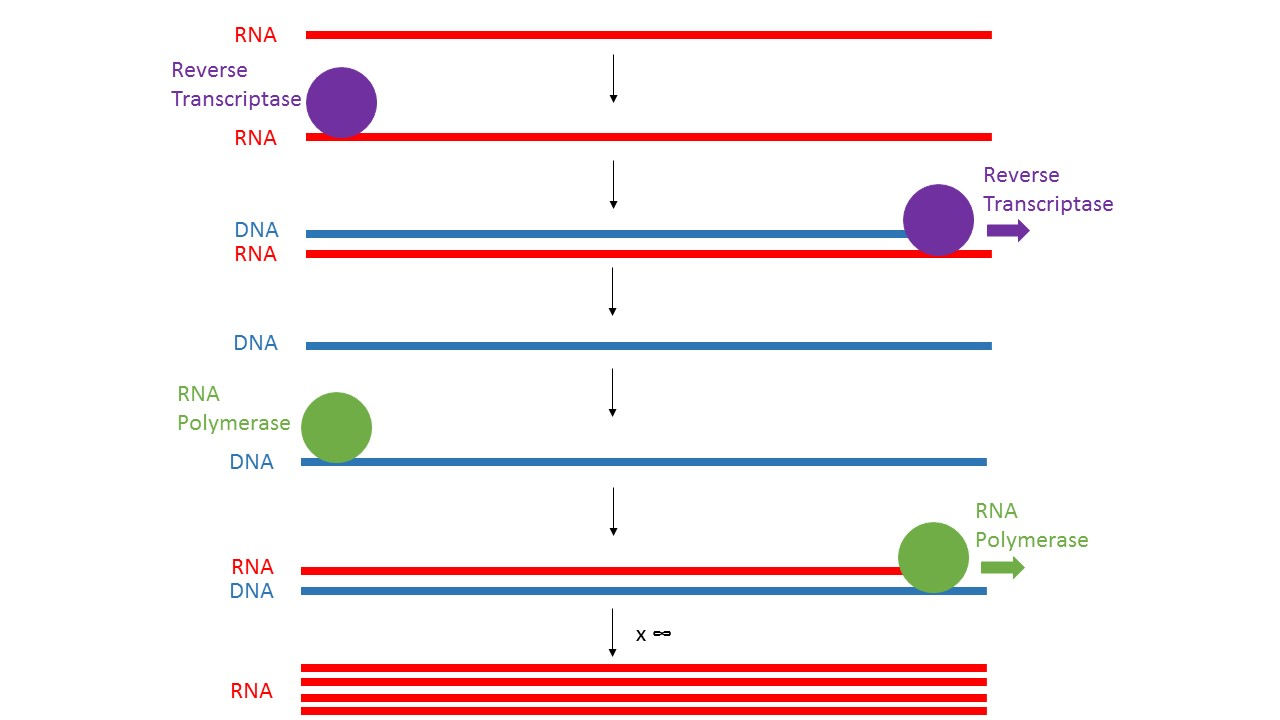
RNA -> DNA -> RNA
