= Fidelity (molecular biology) =

Fidelity, in molecular biology, refers to the accuracy of replication of genetic material, such as DNA or RNA. Replication errors result in mutations that can negatively affect cell viability and health, however, can provide genetic variation to a population.

== DNA ==
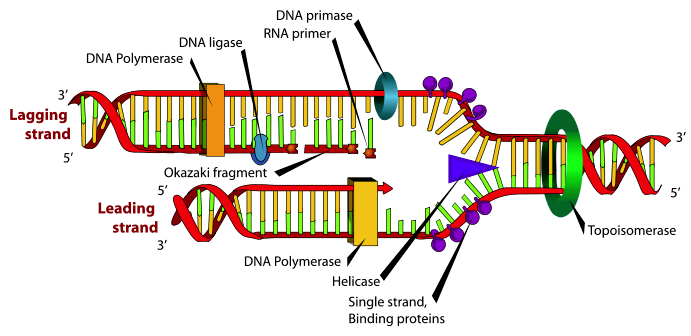
DNA Replication

To maintain genetic integrity and continuity, DNA polymerases replicate DNA highly accurately. For prokaryotic and eukaryotic cells, DNA is estimated to have one wrong nucleotide incorporated once every 10^{8} to 10^{10} nucleotides polymerized.

=== Replication errors ===
==== Base substitution ====
A base substitution error, otherwise known as a point mutation, is the result of a misinsertion followed by mismatch extension without proofreading. This can cause three different type of mutations: silent, missense, and nonsense mutations.

The rate of these errors vary from 10^{3}-10^{6} nucleotides.

There are two types of these errors: transitions or transversions. These errors depend on the polymerase's selectivity.

==== Strand misalignment ====
Strand misalignment errors result in frameshift mutations that can either equal or exceed base substitution rates.

Slippage between the template and primer during replication results in misaligned intermediates. If the unpaired nucleotide is in the template strand, a deletion error occurs. If the unpaired nucleotide is in the primer strand, an insertion error occurs. If a nucleotide is correctly incorporated before further synthesis, realignment occurs that can potentially result in a base substitution.

=== Mechanisms ===
==== Nucleotide selectivity ====
DNA polymerases are estimated to make an error every 10^{3}-10^{6} nucleotides polymerized.

==== Proofreading ====
Proofreading improves the fidelity of DNA synthesis by a factor of 10^{2}-10^{3}. Transition errors are less efficiently proofread than transversion errors.

===== Mismatch repair =====
Postreplicative DNA mismatch repair, otherwise known as MMR, repair replication errors that escape proofreading.

== RNA ==
RNA polymerases have mechanisms to select the correct nucleotides, prevent the extension of mismatches, and to excise mismatches after misincorporation.

== Effects ==
Infidelity results in mutations, which in turn, leads to genetic variation within a population. In some cases, when survival is threatened, DNA fidelity decreases to increase the chance of favorable mutations. In Bacterial populations, there are two classes of genes that accelerate genetic variation: stress-inducible wild-type genes and genes that increase genetic variability when they lose their functionality.

== See also ==
- Fidelity
