= Ligase chain reaction =

Method of DNA amplification

The ligase chain reaction (LCR) is a method of DNA amplification. The ligase chain reaction (LCR) is an amplification process that differs from polymerase chain reaction (PCR) in that it involves a thermostable ligase to join two probes or other molecules together which can then be amplified by standard PCR cycling. Each cycle results in a doubling of the target nucleic acid molecule. A key advantage of LCR is greater specificity as compared to PCR. Thus, LCR requires two completely different enzymes to operate properly: ligase, to join probe molecules together, and a thermostable polymerase (e.g., Taq polymerase) to amplify those molecules involved in successful ligation. The probes involved in the ligation are designed such that the 5′ end of one probe is directly adjacent to the 3′ end of the other probe, thereby providing the requisite 3′-OH and 5′-PO_{4} group substrates for the ligase.

LCR was originally developed to detect point mutations; a single base mismatch at the junction of the two probe molecules is all that is needed to prevent ligation. By performing the ligation right at the T_{m} of the oligonucleotide probe, only perfectly matched primer:template duplexes will be tolerated. LCR can also be used to amplify template molecules that have been successfully ligated for the purpose of assessing ligation efficiency and producing a large amount of product with even greater specificity than PCR. Thus, LCR is not necessarily an alternative, but rather a complement, to PCR.

== Target conditions ==
It has been widely used for the detection of single base mutations, as in certain genetic diseases.

LCR and PCR may be used to detect gonorrhea and chlamydia, and may be performed on first-catch urine samples, providing easy collection and a large yield of organisms. Endogenous inhibitors limit the sensitivity, but if this effect could be eliminated, LCR and PCR would have clinical advantages over any other methods of diagnosing gonorrhea and chlamydia. Among these methods, LCR is emerging as the most sensitive method with high specificity for known single-nucleotide polymorphism (SNP) detection (20). LCR was first developed in 1989 by multiple groups, who used thermostable DNA ligase to discriminate between normal and mutant DNA and to amplify the allele-specific product. A mismatch at the 3′ end of the discriminating primer prevents the DNA ligase from joining the two fragments together. By using both strands of genomic DNA as targets for oligonucleotide hybridization, the products generated from two sets of adjacent oligonucleotide primers, complementary to each target strand in one round of ligation, can become the targets for the next round. The amount of the products can thus be increased exponentially by repeated thermal cycling.

== See also ==
- Gene amplification

== General reading ==
- Walker, J. M., & Rapley, R. (2005). Medical biomethods handbook. Totowa, N.J.: Humana Press. ISBN 978-1-59259-870-0
